= List of lighthouses in Poland =

This is a list of lighthouses in Poland.

== Lighthouses ==
Name	Image	Voivodeship	Location	Year built	Notes
Czołpino Lighthouse		Pomerania	Czołpino; 54°43′5.7″N 17°14′28.9″E	1875	
Darłowo Lighthouse		West Pomerania	Darłowo; 54°26′25.1″N 16°22′43.1″E	1885	
Gąski Lighthouse		West Pomerania	Gąski; 54°14′34.3″N 15°52′21.9″E	1878	
Gdańsk Nowy Port Lighthouse		Pomerania	Gdańsk; 54°24′23″N 18°39′40″E	1894	Inactive since 1984 when it was replaced by Gdańsk Port Północny Lighthouse.
Gdańsk Port Północny Lighthouse		Pomerania	Gdańsk; 54°24′00.5″N 18°41′46.4″E	1984	
Góra Szwedów Lighthouse		Pomerania	Hel; 54°37′35.5″N 18°49′09.8″E	1936	Deactivated in 1990.
Hel Lighthouse		Pomerania	Hel; 54°36′0.1″N 18°48′46.6″E	1942	
Jarosławiec Lighthouse		West Pomerania	Jarosławiec; 54°32′23.1″N 16°32′32.3″E	1838	
Kikut Lighthouse		West Pomerania	Wolin; 53°58′53.5″N 14°34′49.7″E		
Kołobrzeg Lighthouse		West Pomerania	Kołobrzeg; 54°11′11.0″N 15°33′15.3″E	1909	
Krynica Morska Lighthouse		Pomerania	Krynica Morska; 54°23′7.3″N 19°27′2.8″E	1951	The original lighthouse, built in 1895, was destroyed in 1945 after being mined by retreating German forces.
Niechorze Lighthouse		Pomerania	Niechorze; 54°5′41.0″N 15°3′50.7″E	1866	
Rozewie Lighthouse		Pomerania	Rozewie; 54°49′47″N 18°20′9″E	1822	Just west of this station, another lighthouse was established in 1878, but was deactivated already in 1910.
Sopot Lighthouse		Pomerania	Sopot; 54°26′43.1″N 18°34′13.4″E	1904	Lit in 1957, the tower had originally been built in 1904 as part of a spa.
Stilo Lighthouse		Pomerania	Osetnik; 54°47′12.6″N 17°44′2.7″E	1906	
Świnoujście Lighthouse		West Pomerania	Świnoujście; 53°54′58″N 14°17′04″E	1857	The tallest brick lighthouse.
Ustka Lighthouse		Pomerania	Ustka; 54°35′16.5″N 16°51′16.6″E	1892	
Wisłoujście Fortress		Pomerania	Gdańsk; 54°23′41″N 18°40′51″E	1482	The circular tower at the centre of the fortress was used as a lighthouse until 1758.

== See also ==
- Lists of lighthouses and lightvessels
