= Ustka Lighthouse =

Lighthouse in Poland

Ustka Lighthouse Stolpmünde
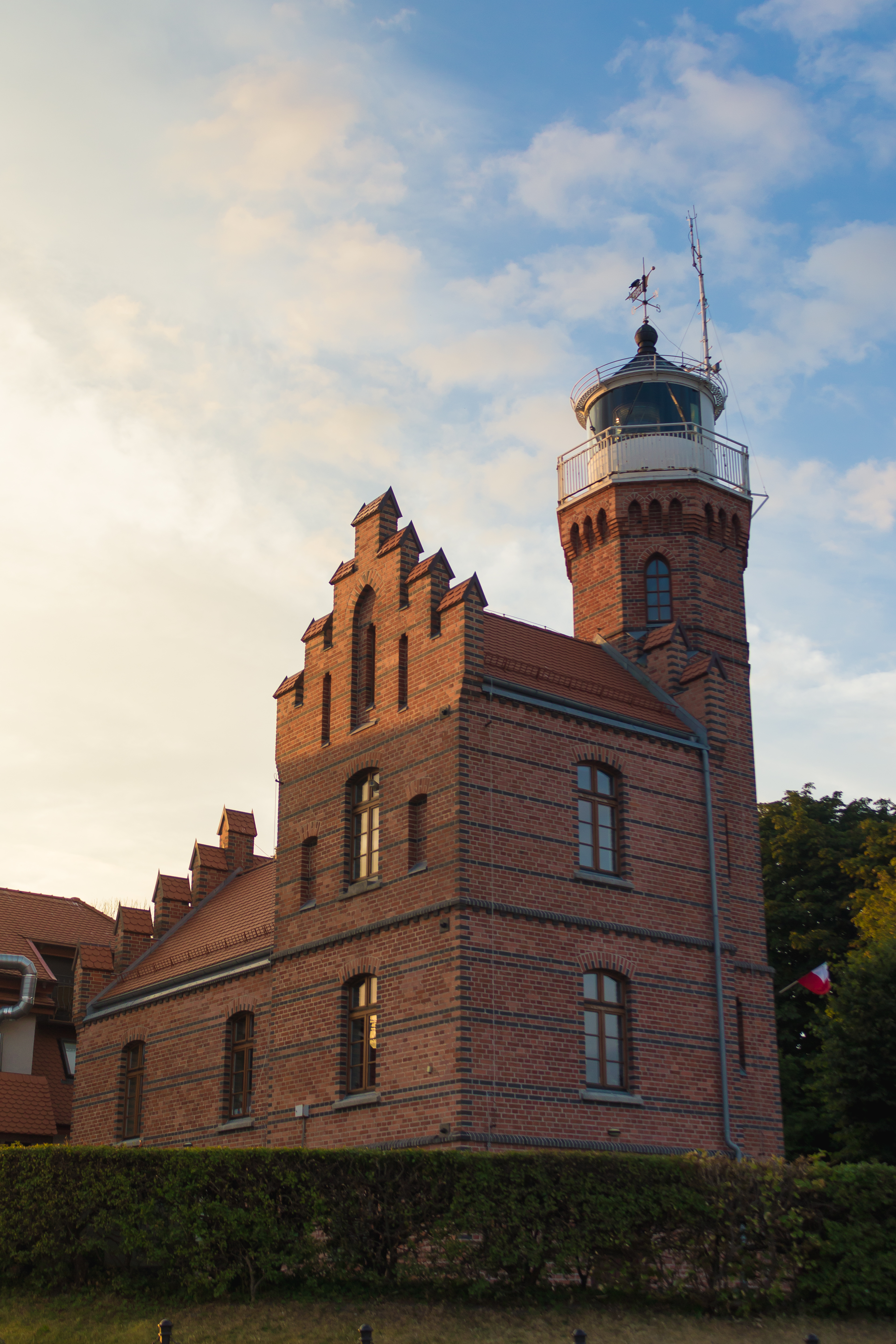
- Location: Ustka; Pomeranian Voivodeship; Poland
- Coordinates: 54°35′16.5″N 16°51′16.6″E

Tower
- Constructed: 18 71 (first)
- Construction: brick tower
- Height: 19.5 metres (64 ft)
- Shape: octagonal tower with balcony and lantern
- Markings: unpainted brick tower, white lantern
- Power source: mains electricity
- Heritage: immovable monument in Poland

Light
- First lit: 1892 (current)
- Focal height: 22.2 metres (73 ft)
- Lens: first order Fresnel lens
- Range: 18 nautical miles (33 km; 21 mi)
- Characteristic: Oc W 6s.

Ustka Lighthouse (Polish: Latarnia Morska Ustka) is a lighthouse located in Ustka (formerly Stolpmünde), on the Polish coast of the Baltic Sea.

The lighthouse is located in between the Jarosławiec Lighthouse and the Czołpino Lighthouse.

== History ==
The lighthouse stands at the base of the eastern breakwater of Ustka's harbour – protecting the port's entrance way. Ustka was a very important coastal town for the nearby Słupsk – for transportation of goods and Baltic travel. In 1871 a mast was constructed near the harbour's admiralty station; powered by an oil lamp on the mast. It shone with a red light and was visible at a distance of 6 nautical miles. Later on, the light was elevated to a height of 11.6 metres shortly after the building of a new red brick harbour admiralty station, an octagonal lighthouse that was constructed in the western side of the building. It was only in 1904 that the character of the light was changed to white and intermittent. Currently the lighthouse is open to the public and the view gallery at the top of the lighthouse can be reached by a concrete and metal staircase.

== Technical data ==
- Light characteristic
  - Light: 4 s.
  - Darkness: 2 s.
  - Period: 6 s.

== See also ==
- List of lighthouses in Poland
