= Soviet submarine S-4 =

History

Soviet Union
- Name: S-4
- Builder: Baltic Shipyard, Leningrad
- Yard number: 277
- Laid down: 3 January 1936
- Launched: 17 September 1936
- Commissioned: 27 November 1939
- Stricken: 31 March 1945
- Fate: Sunk on 6 January 1945 in Gdańsk Bay by torpedo boat T3

General characteristics
- Class & type: S-class submarine (Series IX-bis)
- Displacement: 856 t (842 long tons) surfaced; 1,090 t (1,070 long tons) submerged
- Length: 77.8 m (255 ft 3 in)
- Beam: 6.4 m (21 ft 0 in)
- Draft: 4 m (13 ft 1 in)
- Propulsion: 2 × diesel engines; 2 × electric motors; 2 × shafts
- Speed: 18.85 knots (34.91 km/h) surfaced; 8.8 knots (16.3 km/h) submerged
- Range: 9,500 nmi (17,600 km)
- Test depth: 80 m (260 ft)
- Complement: 45
- Armament: 6 × torpedo tubes; 2 × deck guns

Service record
- Part of: Baltic Fleet 1st Submarine Brigade
- Commanders: D. S. Abrosimov; 27 November 1939 – 15 August 1942; A. A. Bashchenko; 15 August 1942 – 20 May 1943; E. G. Yunakov; 25 May – 20 August 1943; V. A. Chervinsky; 20 August 1944 – 9 March 1944; A. A. Klyushkin; 17 March 1944 – 6 January 1945
- Operations: First war patrol: 30 January – 8 February 1940; Second war patrol: 23 June –10 July 1941; Third war patrol: 6 August – 17 August 1941; Fourth war patrol: 19 October – 18 November 1941; Fifth war patrol: 13 June – 28 July 1942; Sixth war patrol: 14 October – 23 October 1944; Seventh war patrol: 24 November 1944 – 6 January 1945
- Victories: 2 merchant ships sunk (1,751 GRT)

S-4 was an S-class submarine of the Soviet Navy. The boat entered service in the Baltic Fleet in November 1939 and took part in the Winter War and in World War II. S-4 carried out seven patrols in the Baltic Sea and sank two merchant ships for a total of 1,751 gross register tons (GRT), before being destroyed by the German torpedo boat T3 in early January 1945.

== Design ==
The Srednyaya or S-class submarine (Russian: Средняя, lit. 'medium'), also called the Stalinets class (Russian: Сталинец, lit. 'follower of Stalin'), was an ocean-going diesel electric attack submarine. Its pressure hull had seven compartments, and the Series IX-bis submarine's displacement was 856 tonnes (842 long tons) while on the surface and 1,090 tonnes (1,070 long tons) while submerged. It had a length of 77.8 m (255 ft 3 in), a beam of 6.4 metres (21 ft 0 in), and a draft of 4 metres (13 ft 1 in). It had two diesel engines to power it on the surface and two electric motors for when it was submerged, providing 4,000 shaft horsepower (3,000 kW) and 1,100 shaft horsepower (820 kW), respectively, to the two propeller shafts. This gave it a speed of 18.85 knots (34.91 km/h) on the surface and 8.8 knots (16.3 km/h) while underwater, and the submarine had a range of 9,500 nautical miles (17,600 km). Its test depth was 80 metres (260 ft), and as armament it had six 530 mm (21 in) torpedo tubes, one 100 mm (3.9 in) deck gun, and one 45 mm (1.8 in) gun.

S-4 was the first of the Series IX-bis boats, which were a modification of the original three boats of the S-class, the Series IX. The main difference between them was the replacement of German components used in Series IX with Soviet equivalents that could be manufactured domestically.

== Commissioning ==
S-4 was originally called N-4 (yard number 277) and was laid down on 3 January 1936 at the Baltic Shipyard in Leningrad. The submarine was launched on 17 September 1936, and on 20 October 1937 its designation was changed to S-4. The boat was commissioned on 27 November 1939 and assigned to the Red Banner Baltic Fleet, with Captain-lieutenant Dmitry S. Abrosimov in command. S-4 became part of the 16th Submarine Squadron of the Baltic Fleet's 1st Submarine Brigade.

== Winter War ==
Even though S-4 had entered service just before the outbreak of the Soviet war with Finland in late November 1939, the submarine spent the first two months of the conflict at its base in Liepāja, Latvia.

=== First patrol ===
S-4 went on its first war patrol on 30 January 1940 under the command of Captain-lieutenant Abrosimov. Instead of taking part in the naval blockade of Finland, S-4 was tasked with monitoring the Swedish Navy in a position between the islands of Gotland and Öland. The submarine spent several days at the location before being ordered to return to its base. S-4 had to pass through the ice on the Baltic Sea on its way back, which it did initially on its own before getting stuck, and received assistance from the gunboat Krasnoye Znamya. S-4 had to be towed the rest of the way and it returned to port on 8 February 1940. The submarine remained at its base for the rest of the conflict because of the sea ice. The ice had also damaged its hull.

== World War II ==
In May 1940 S-4 was ordered to be transferred with several other submarines to the Northern Fleet, but this was cancelled in the following month. On 11 February 1941 it was reassigned to the 1st Submarine Squadron of the Baltic Fleet's 1st Submarine Brigade.

=== Second patrol ===
At the start of Operation Barbarossa S-4 was located at the Ust-Dvinsk base in Soviet Latvia. It went on patrol near Memel starting on 23 June 1941. S-4 attacked an unidentified merchant ship on 25 June with no success. On the 27th, S-4 encountered another Soviet submarine, the minelayer submarine L-3, which it mistook for an enemy initially. S-4 later found some minesweepers but chose not to attack them, and returned to base on 10 July 1941.

While it was docked S-4 was attacked by aircraft, and on 12 July it departed for the port of Tallinn. It later evacuated Tallinn with the rest of the Soviet Baltic Fleet.

=== Third patrol ===
S-4 began its next patrol on 6 August 1941, going to the Memel area, where it attacked a German merchant ship convoy on the 10th. The crew of S-4 thought they sank a tanker after hearing the explosions of the torpedoes they fired, though this turned out to be false because the torpedoes missed. After this, S-4 was subjected to a depth charge attack lasting for 10 hours and involving 33 depth charges. The submarine took significant damage to its hull and ballast tanks, the lights went out, and its hatches began leaking. When the attack ended S-4 rose to the surface and left. Once on the surface, the crew found buoys with lights that were left behind by the Germans to mark the spot where it had been. S-4 ended its patrol and on 17 August was met by escort ships near the Ristna Lighthouse to guide the submarine to Tallinn. For this patrol, S-4's commanding officer, Captain-lieutenant Dmitry Abrosimov, was recommended by his superiors to be made a Hero of the Soviet Union, but instead he was awarded the Order of Lenin.

From 28 to 29 August 1941, S-4 was transferred with the main force of the Baltic Fleet from Tallinn to Kronstadt, and during September and October the submarine underwent repairs.

=== Fourth patrol ===
After its repairs, S-4 went on patrol on 19 October 1941 near the island of Gogland. The submarine waited for German warships that were expected to be in the area but they never arrived. On 1 November S-4 damaged its left propeller on some rocks, but it remained on patrol until the 17th, which was uneventful. S-4 returned to Kronstadt on the following day, and on 22 November it was transferred to Leningrad for repairs that lasted for several months.

=== Fifth patrol ===
S-4 left Kronstadt for the island of Lavansaari on 13 June 1942, then proceeded from there with several other submarines into the Baltic. S-4 was assigned to the patrol area near Gdańsk Bay, but on 15 June it had to briefly return to Lavansaari for some more repairs. Late on the 16th the submarine departed to return to its patrol area, and it was attacked by some Finnish patrol boats on the 19th near Porkkala Kallbåda, which caused significant damage. The crew made successful repairs and arrived near the Riksgaft lighthouse on 28 June, close to Gdańsk Bay, where S-4 fired torpedoes that same day against the German freighter Fritz Schoop. None of the torpedoes made a hit, and the submarine's commander decided against surfacing to attack the transport with deck guns so close to the coast. The next day, German forces arrived at the location of the attack to search for S-4 and dropped 20 depth charges, though S-4 was able to get away.

On 13 July 1942 S-4 was ordered to Karlskrona, where it encountered some transports but the commander decided not to attack because they were in Swedish waters. The submarine began returning to its base on 20 July, and on the 24th it encountered a convoy of ships in the area close to the Pakri Lighthouse. S-4 fired torpedoes at a ship but none of them hit. Afterwards S-4 returned to Kronstadt on 28 July despite being attacked by Finnish aircraft and coastal artillery along the way. During the patrol S-4 had problems with its torpedoes, as they either did not leave the torpedo tube or sank before reaching their target.

In mid-August 1942, when S-4 was sent to Leningrad for repairs, it was hit by a mine as it approached the Leningrad canal, which killed its commanding officer Abrosimov and several others. The submarine ran aground for a few hours before it was assisted and able to get underway again. S-4 reached the city without any further damage. There the boat received several months of repair work, but when it became ready to go to sea again, on 30 April 1943 hydrogen vapor from the electric battery caused an explosion, delaying its return to service until 1944. During this time S-4 had several new captains. On 16 September 1944 the submarine received orders to prepare for a patrol.

=== Sixth patrol ===
S-4 went on patrol on 4 October 1944 under the command of Captain 3rd rank Alexei A. Klyushkin. On the 11th it arrived to a position about fifty miles north of the Stilo Lighthouse on the coast of Poland, where on the following day S-4 attacked merchant ships on several occasions. Almost all of its attacks missed because of continued problems with its torpedoes, though it sank the fishing trawler Taunus. It had more success on 13 October, when S-4 torpedoed and sank the 1,533-ton tanker Terra, at a location 24 miles northwest of the Stilo Lighthouse. Over the next several days S-4 made several other attacks against merchant ships in the same area without any more successes. It returned to a base in Helsinki on 23 October 1944.

=== Seventh patrol ===
S-4 began its last patrol on 24 November 1944, and on 14 December it attacked a convoy near the Akmeņrags Lighthouse, Latvia, without any success. It possibly attacked another convoy on the 22nd near Pillau. Sometime between 5 or 7 January 1945 (sources give different dates), S-4 surfaced 100 meters in front of a torpedo boat, T3, that was escorting a German transport ship. T3 rammed the submarine and then followed up by dropping depth charges. S-4 was lost with all 48 hands, and it was stricken from the navy list by the Soviet Navy on 31 March 1945.

== Career summary ==
Ships sunk by S-4
Date	Ship	Flag	Tonnage	Notes
12 October 1944	Taunus	(Nazi Germany)	218 GRT	torpedo
13 October 1944	Terra	(Nazi Germany)	1,533 GRT	torpedo
Total:			1,751 GRT	

== Wreck site ==
The wreckage of S-4 was discovered in the summer of 2014 at the depth of 72 metres (236 ft) near the coast of Kaliningrad. Part of the hull near the stern had been destroyed by a mine.

== Bibliography ==
- Budzbon, Przemysław (1980). "Soviet Union". In Chesneau, Roger (ed.). Conway's All the World's Fighting Ships 1922–1946. Conway Maritime Press. pp. 318–346. ISBN 0-85177-146-7.
- Budzbon, Przemysław; Radziemski, Jan & Twardowski, Marek (2022). Warships of the Soviet Fleets 1939–1945. Vol. I: Major Combatants. Naval Institute Press. ISBN 978-1-68247-877-6.
- Polmar, Norman & Noot, Jurrien (1991). Submarines of the Russian and Soviet Navies, 1718–1990. Naval Institute Press. ISBN 0-87021-570-1.
- Rohwer, Jürgen (2005). Chronology of the War at Sea 1939–1945: The Naval History of World War Two (Third Revised ed.). Naval Institute Press. ISBN 1-59114-119-2.
- Yakubov, Vladimir; Worth, Richard (2008). Raising the Red Banner: A Pictorial History of Stalin's Fleet 1920–1945. Spellmount. ISBN 978-1-86227-450-1.
