= Rozewie =

Rozewie may refer to:

- Cape Rozewie in northern Poland
- Rozewie, Pomeranian Voivodeship, a village in northern Poland
