= Stilo Lighthouse =

Lighthouse in Poland

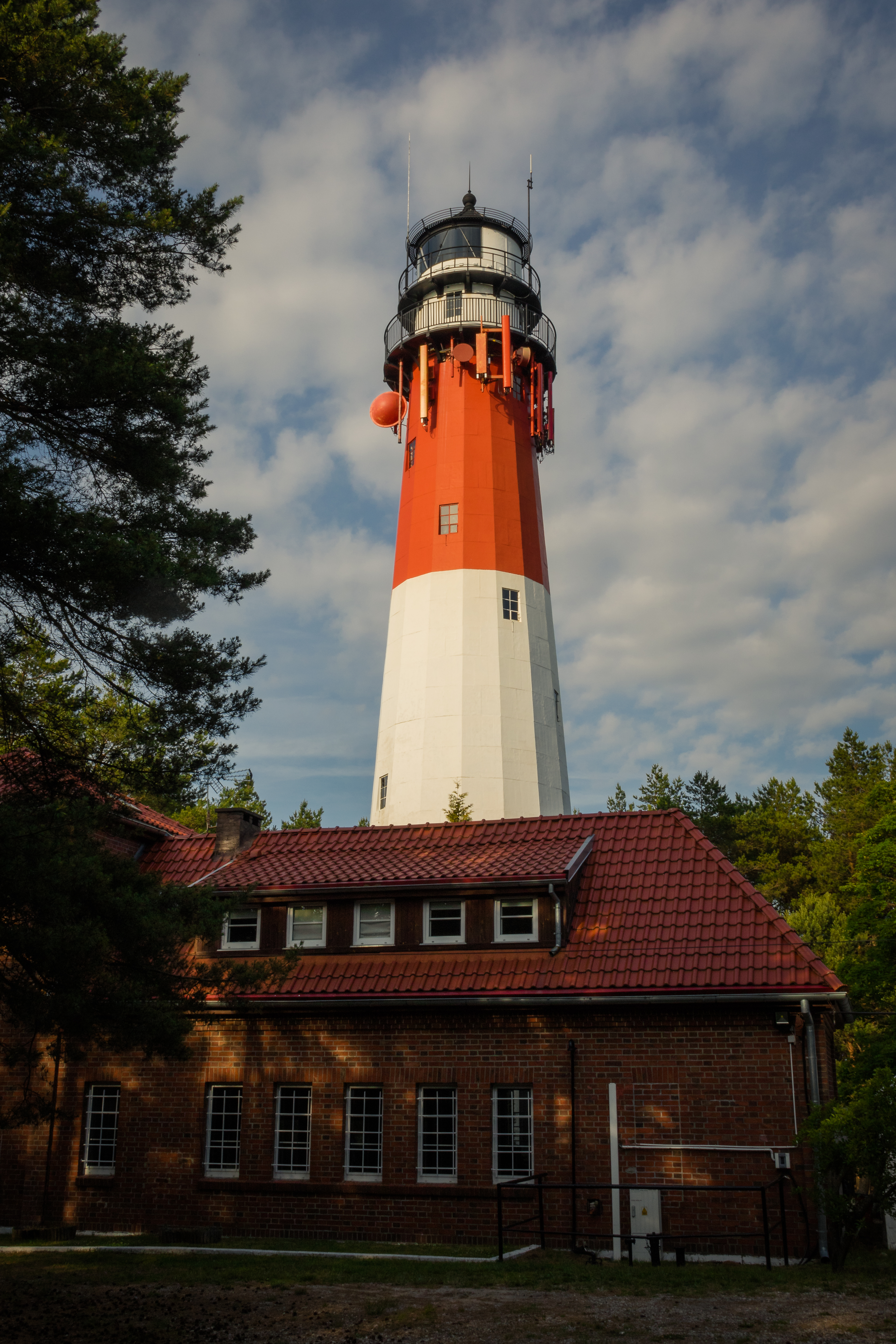
- Location: Osetnik; Pomeranian Voivodeship; Poland
- Coordinates: 54°47′12.6″N 17°44′02.7″E

Tower
- Constructed: 1906
- Construction: cast iron tower
- Height: 33.4 metres (110 ft)
- Shape: 16-side prism tower with double balcony and lantern
- Markings: black, white and red bands tower, white lantern
- Heritage: immovable monument in Poland

Light
- Focal height: 75 metres (246 ft)
- Range: 23.5 nautical miles (43.5 km; 27.0 mi)
- Characteristic: Fl (3) W 12s.

Stilo Lighthouse (Polish: Latarnia Morska Stilo) is a lighthouse located in Osetnik (formerly Stilo) on the Polish coast of the Baltic Sea, close to the village of Sasino.

The lighthouse is located in between the Czołpino Lighthouse and the Rozewie Lighthouse.

== History ==
The lighthouse was built between 1904 and 1906 after plans by German architect Walter Körteg. The lighthouse was constructed out of a wooden frame, by the company Julius Pintsch from Berlin. Formerly the lighthouse had a rotating beacon powered by 110 V. In 1926, the lighthouse had undergone modernisation, when the former light system was replaced by a light bulb with the power of 2000 V, installing an additional emergency gas-powered system. In 2006, on the lighthouse's one hundredth year of existence – the lighthouse had undergone a complete renovation; which included a new exterior paint-scheme; a characteristic of the lighthouse.

== Technical data ==
- Light characteristic
  - Light: 0.3 s.
  - Darkness: 2.2 s.
  - Light: 0.3 s.
  - Darkness: 2.2 s.
  - Light: 0.3 s.
  - Darkness: 6.7 s.
  - Period: 12 s.

== See also ==
- List of lighthouses in Poland
