= Góra Szwedów Lighthouse =

Deactivated lighthouse in Poland

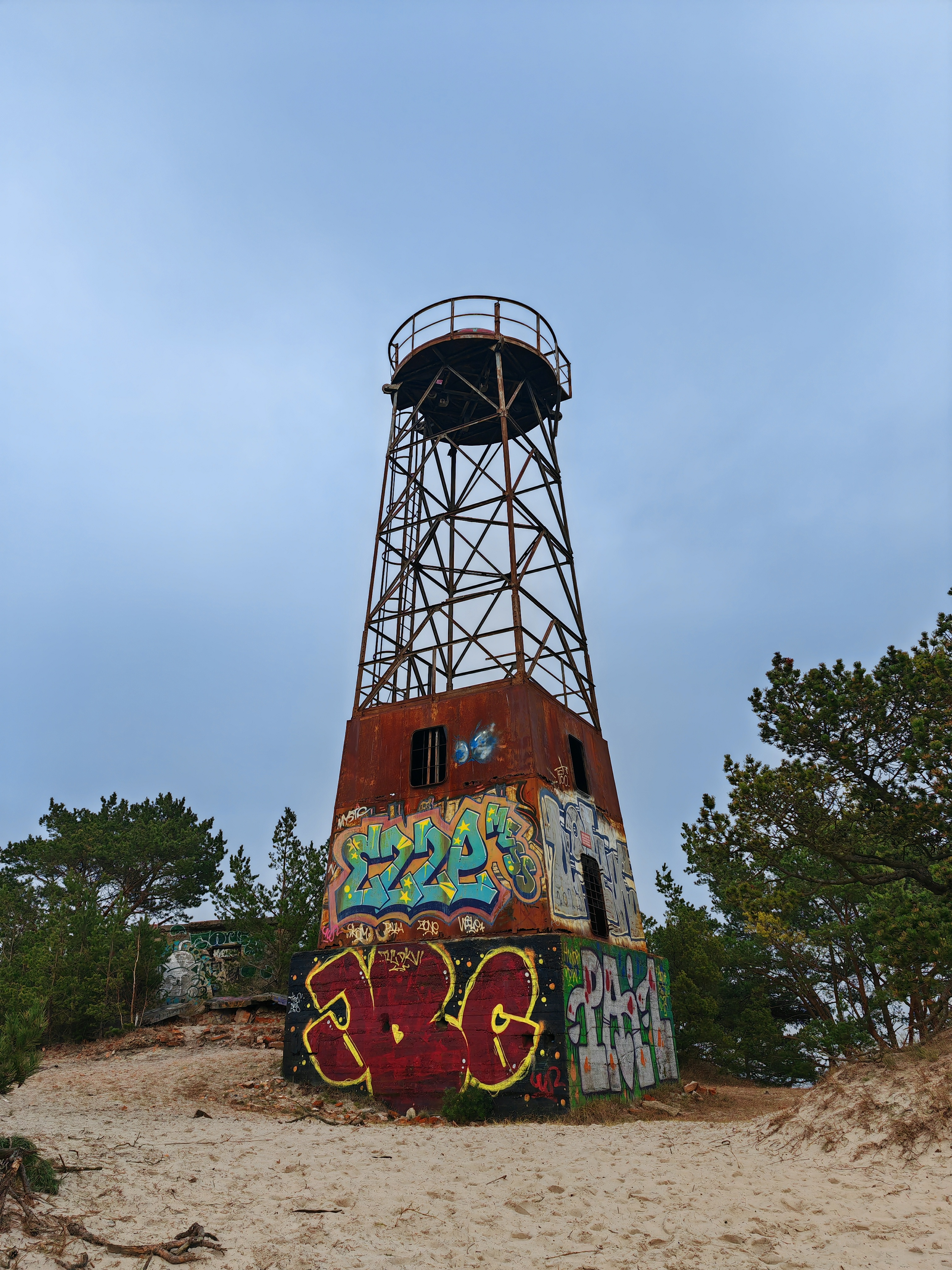
- Location: Hel; Puck County; Pomeranian Voivodeship; Poland
- Coordinates: 54°37′35.5″N 18°49′09.8″E

Tower
- Constructed: 1936
- Foundation: reinforced concrete
- Construction: steel skeletal tower
- Height: 17 metres (56 ft)
- Shape: square tower with platform and no lantern

Light
- First lit: 1936
- Deactivated: 1990
- Focal height: 34.30 metres (112.5 ft)
- Range: 14 nautical miles (26 km; 16 mi)
- Characteristic: Iso W 30s

Góra Szwedów Lighthouse (lit. 'Swedish Hill Lighthouse') is a deactivated lighthouse on the coast of the Baltic Sea in the administrative region of the town of Hel, Puck County, Pomeranian Voivodeship, in Poland. The lighthouse is located on the Hel Peninsula, on Góra Szwedów, a 19-metre-high (62 ft) hill. The lighthouse is located between the Jastarnia Lighthouse and the Hel Lighthouse. The lighthouse replaced the Jastarnia Bór Lighthouse. The lighthouse was deactivated in 1990.

== See also ==
- List of lighthouses in Poland
