= Rozewie Lighthouse =

Lighthouse in Poland

Rozewie Lighthouse East Tower
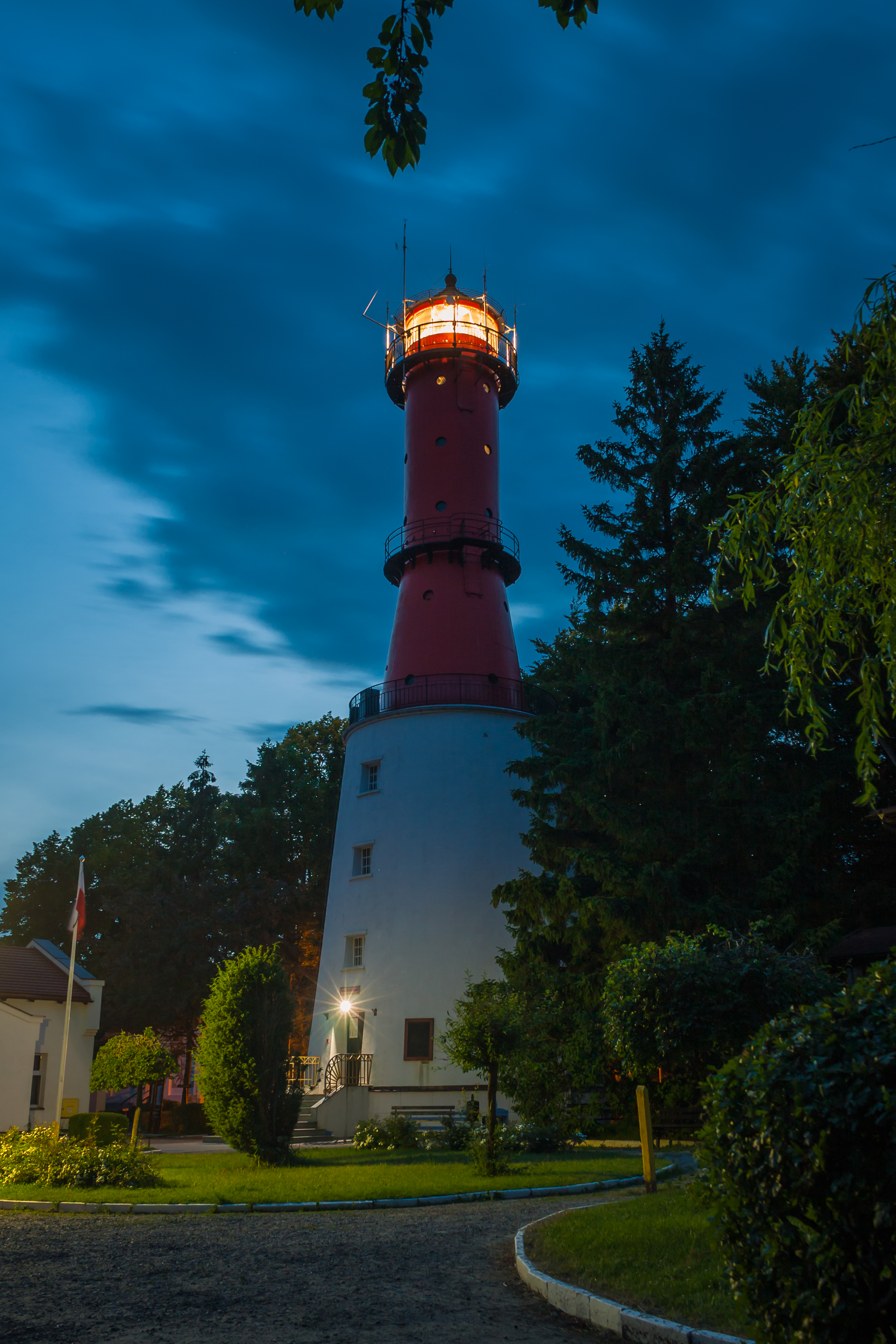
- Location: Rozewie, Pomeranian Voivodeship; Poland
- Coordinates: 54°49′49.4″N 18°20′10.8″E

Tower
- Constructed: 1822
- Construction: concrete half lower tower, steel upper tower
- Height: 32.7 metres (107 ft)
- Shape: tapered cylindrical two-stage tower with three balcony and lantern
- Markings: light colour lower tower, red upper tower
- Power source: mains electricity
- Heritage: immovable monument in Poland

Light
- Focal height: 83 metres (272 ft)
- Range: 26 nautical miles (48 km; 30 mi)
- Characteristic: Fl W 3s.

Rozewie Lighthouse (Polish: Latarnia Morska Rozewie) is a lighthouse in the small village of Rozewie, located between Jastrzębia Góra and Władysławowo, on the Polish coast of the Baltic Sea.

The lighthouse is located in between the lighthouse in Stilo and Jastarnia Lighthouse. The lighthouse has the largest focal length among Polish lighthouses.

== History ==
The lighthouse was built in 1822 after a year of construction. Initially, the light source was a rapeseed oil fired lamp located in the lantern room on the top level of the lighthouse; this was replaced in 1866 by the Fresnel apparatus, also oil-fired. Ten years later the light glare was finally replaced by a kerosene lamp.

This lighthouse is linked with a legend created by Leon Wzorek – an elderly lighthouse keeper, Stefan Zeromski who wrote his novel The Wind from the Sea while he was working at the lighthouse. The lighthouse is made up of two parts. The first part is built from brick and resembles a broad, truncated cone, while the second part is standing on top of the brick base, which is made from a steel tube. Of the three observation galleries only the lowest is open to the public; while the highest one – in the signal room can be accessed as an observation deck from which you can locate Władysławowo (to the east) and Jastrzębia Góra (to the west).

Currently, the light glare is an optical system made up of 20 reflector bulbs, 10 on each rotating panel. The tower has a height of 33 metres, with a focal length of 83.2 metres and a range of 26.0 nautical miles. The attraction here is the Lighthouse Museum. Exhibits include a presentation about the evolution of lighthouses from ancient times until today, models of lighthouses and their locations, and a rotating table with a Fresnel lens; near the site, is the new lighthouse which is currently deactivated.

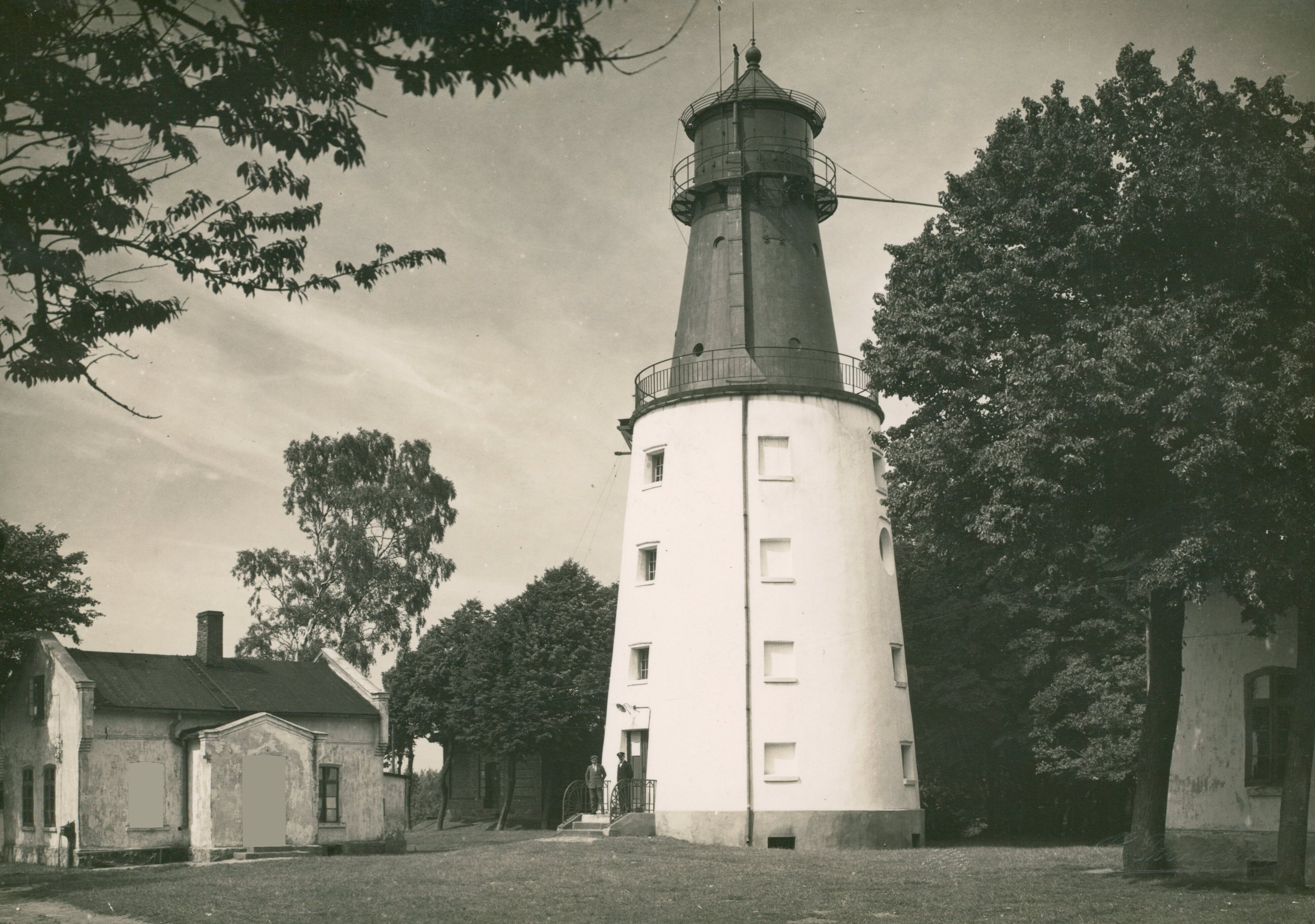
The lighthouse in the 1930s

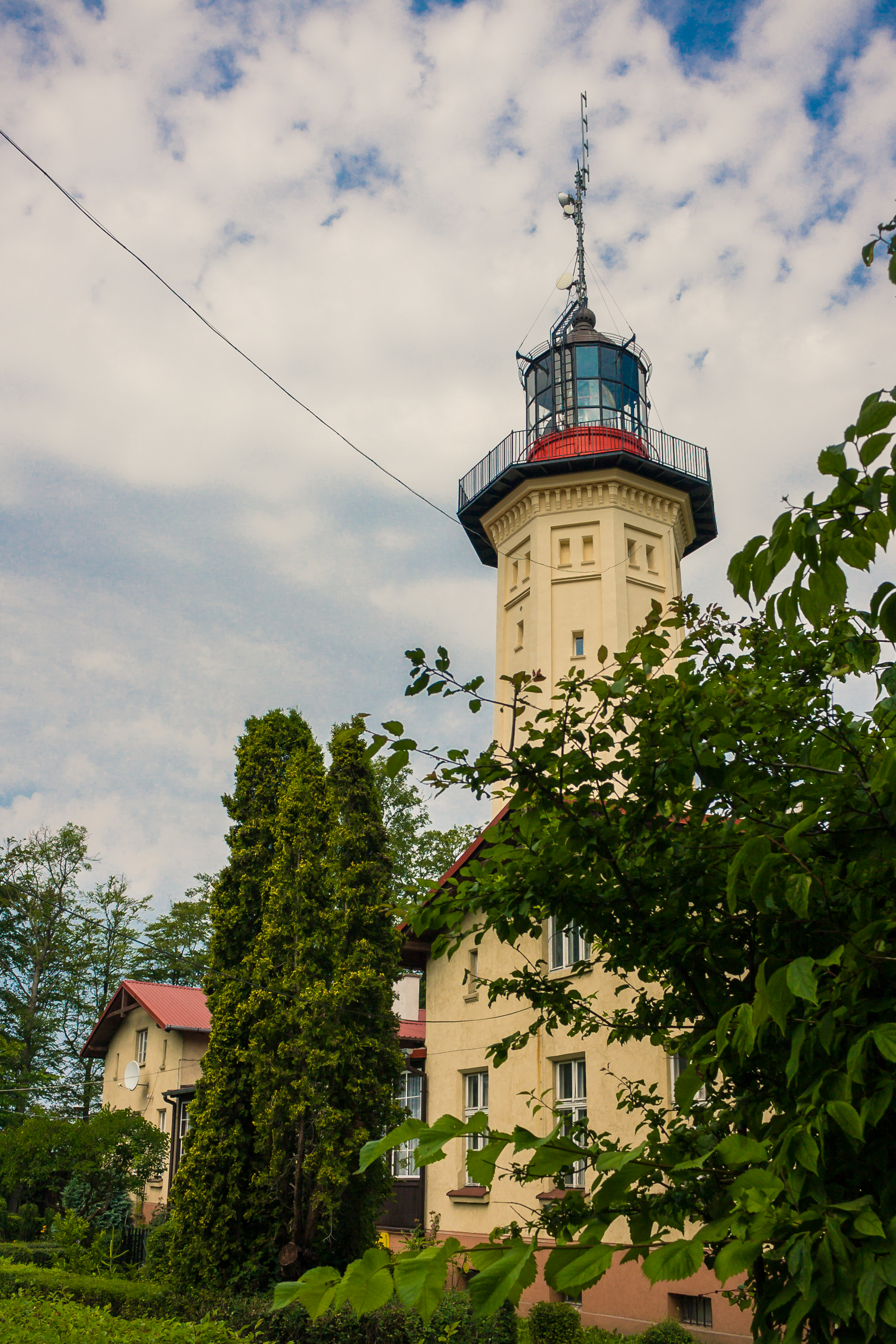
The new lighthouse, currently deactivated

== Technical data ==
- Light characteristic
  - Light: 0.1 s.
  - Darkness: 2.9 s.
  - Period: 3 s.

== See also ==
- List of lighthouses in Poland
