= Górnik (1921 tug) =

Górnik was a sea tug from the interwar period belonging to the Vistula-Baltic Shipping Society, built in 1921, originally served with a German shipowner under the name Galata. It sank on November 1, 1927.

== History ==
The tug was built in 1921 in Flender-Werke shipyard in Lübeck. It was ordered for the shipping company HAPAG in Hamburg under the name Galata, and in 1923 it was delivered to the shipowner Bugsier-, Reederei- und Bergungs AG in Hamburg.

In November 1926, it was purchased by the newly established Polish Society of the Vistula-Baltic Shipping in Tczew and was initially used under the name of Bagatela and finally Górnik for towing lightning bolts transporting coal from Tczew to foreign ports on the Baltic Sea. It was the newest and second most powerful tugboat of the Society.

On November 1, 1927, the Górnik returned from Copenhagen with empty lightning bolts "Felek" and "Bolek". At 3:50 p.m., after passing Stilo, in a storm, as a result of a large wave, the tugboat overturned and sank. Nine people died, including Captain Johannes Pehrs (German), and only the first mechanic, Władysław Szczęsnowicz, survived. The Maritime Chamber ruled that the cause of the sinking could not be established.

== Bibliography ==
- Miciński, Jerzy (1996). Księga statków polskich: 1918-1945. Gdańsk: Polnord, Oskar. ISBN 83-86181-23-0.
