= Gdańsk Port Północny Lighthouse =

Lighthouse in Poland

Gdańsk Port Północny Lighthouse Gdańsk North Port Lighthouse
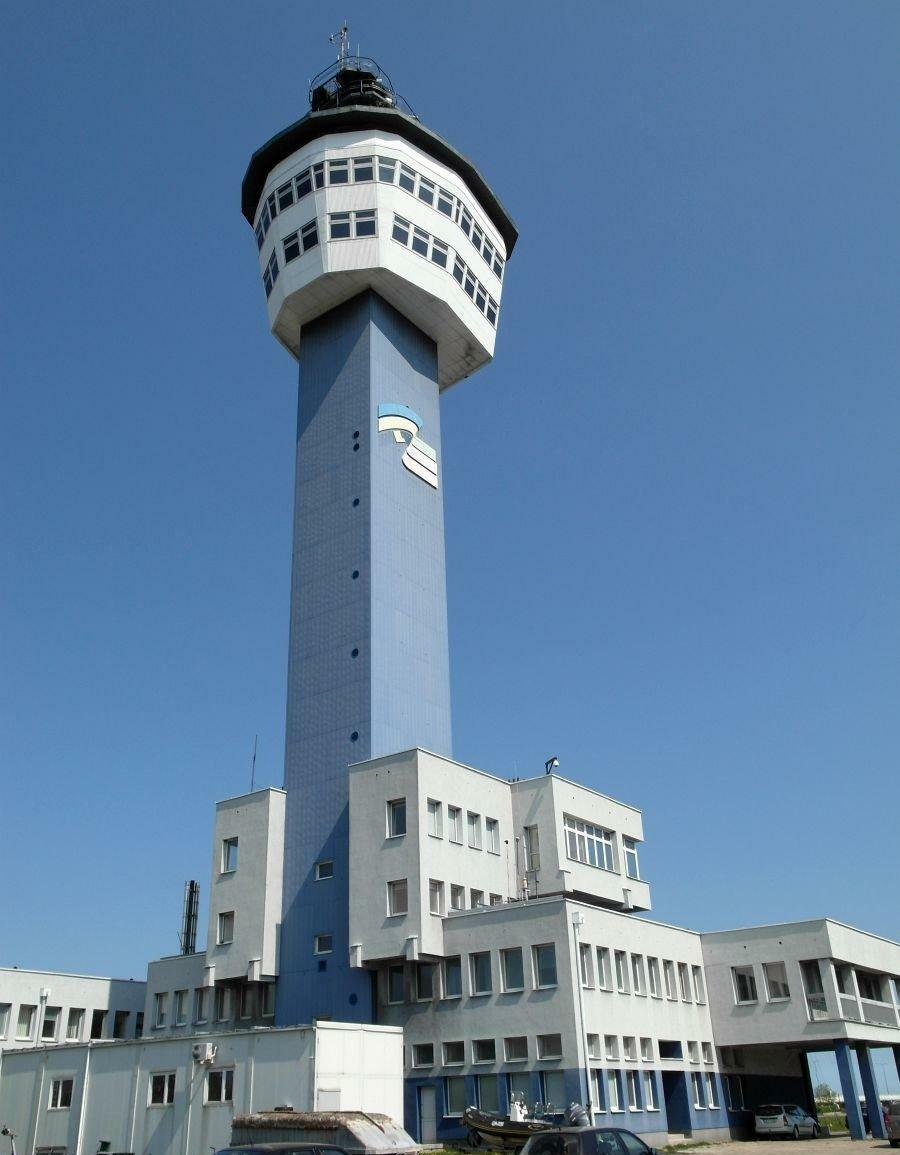
- Location: Gdańsk; Pomeranian Voivodeship; Poland
- Coordinates: 54°24′00.5″N 18°41′46.4″E

Tower
- Constructed: 1984
- Foundation: reinforced concrete
- Height: 61 metres (200 ft)
- Shape: square tower with 3-story control and observation room on the top
- Markings: blue tower, white control and observation room
- Power source: mains electricity

Light
- Focal height: 56 metres (184 ft)
- Range: 25 nautical miles (46 km; 29 mi)
- Characteristic: Fl (3) W 9s.

Gdańsk Port Północny Lighthouse (Gdańsk North Port Lighthouse) is a lighthouse in Gdańsk, located on the Polish coast of the Baltic Sea, by the Bay of Gdańsk. It is the youngest lighthouse in Poland; located between the lighthouse in Hel, and the lighthouse in Krynica Morska.

The lighthouse houses the admiralty of the Port of Gdańsk and is not open for the public. The lighthouse is the only lighthouse in Poland to have a lift to get to the top command deck. The lighthouse was built in 1984.

== Technical data ==
- Light characteristic
  - Light: 0.5 s.
  - Darkness: 1.5 s.
  - Light: 0.5 s.
  - Darkness: 1.5 s.
  - Light: 0.5 s.
  - Darkness: 4.5 s.
  - Period: 9 s.

== See also ==
- List of lighthouses in Poland
