= Niechorze Lighthouse =

Lighthouse in Poland

Niechorze Lighthouse Horst
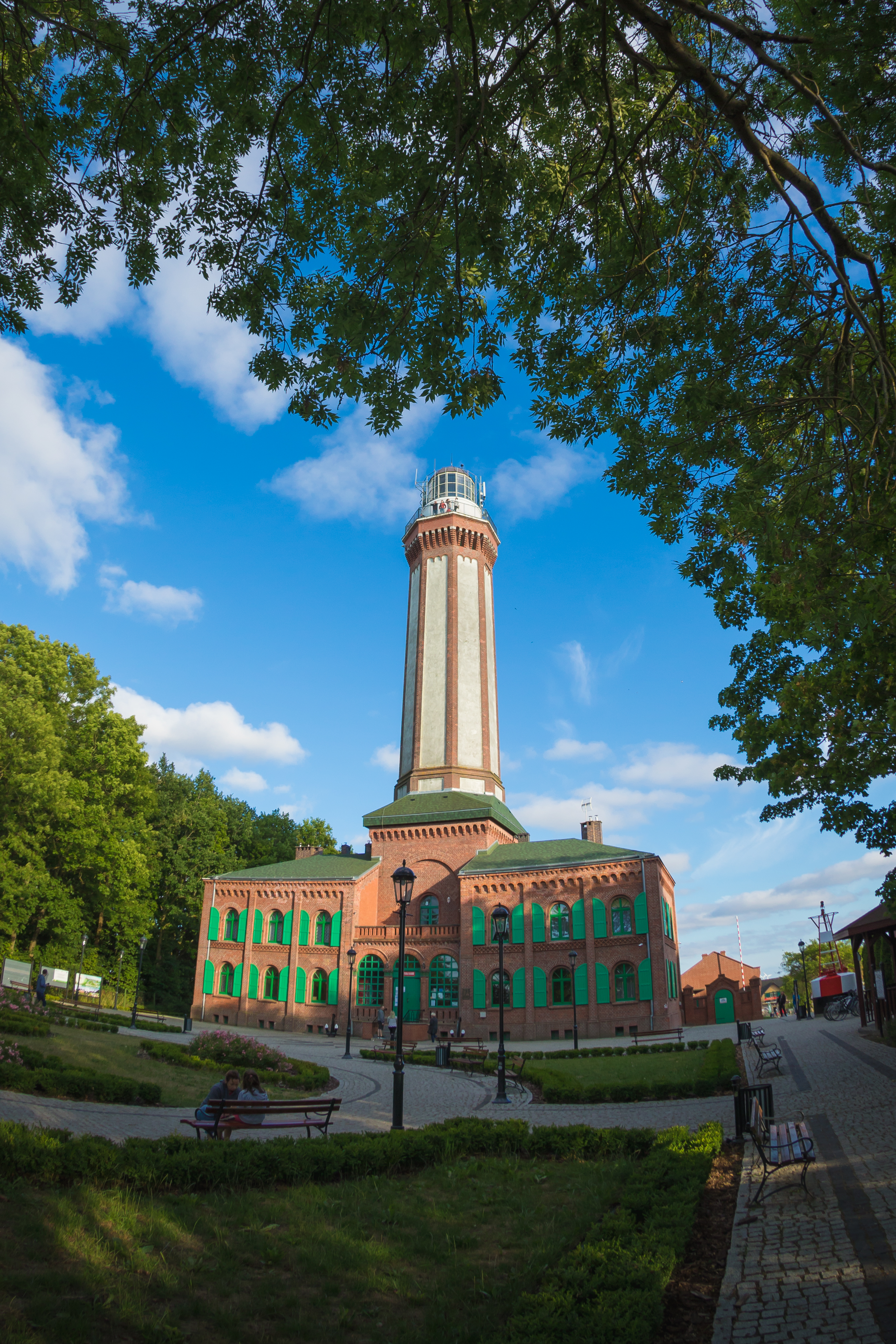
- Location: Niechorze; West Pomeranian Voivodeship; Poland
- Coordinates: 54°05′41.0″N 15°03′50.7″E

Tower
- Constructed: 1866
- Construction: concrete brick covered tower
- Height: 45 metres (148 ft)
- Shape: octagonal tower with balcony and lantern
- Markings: white tower with red brick trim, white lantern
- Heritage: immovable monument in Poland

Light
- First lit: 1866
- Focal height: 62.8 metres (206 ft)
- Range: 20 nautical miles (37 km; 23 mi)
- Characteristic: Fl W 10s.

Niechorze Lighthouse (Polish: Latarnia morska Niechorze) is a lighthouse in Niechorze, on the Polish coast of the Baltic Sea, by a steep cliff. The lighthouse is located in Niechorze, West Pomeranian Voivodeship, in Poland.

The lighthouse is located in between the Kikut Lighthouse (about 30 km to the west), and the Kołobrzeg Lighthouse (34 km to the east).

== History ==
The lighthouse in Niechorze is located at the edge of a steep cliff, with a height of 20 metres. The lighthouse's base is a 13-metre-high (43 ft) square-shaped building, on both sides of the tower. The light glare from the lighthouse can be seen 36 km away due to the 1000w light bulb which is enhanced by 20 prismal crystals. The lighthouse in Niechorze was commissioned by the German Ministry of Shipping in 1863 and started operating on 1 December 1866. Although the lighthouse did not suffer any war damage in World War II, after the liberation of Poland – 8 mines left by the Germans were discovered, and safely removed without detonation. After the end of the Second World War there was a considerable delay restarting the lighthouse. It was not until 18 December 1948 when the lighthouse was finally operational – this was due to the erosion of the cliff which was located close to the lighthouse. The authorities secured the cliff by putting large boulders and rock armour (500 metres of heavy concrete) to secure the cliff and provide a stable ground for the lighthouse. Currently the lighthouse is open to tourists, with a viewpoint – near the lighthouse there is a miniature park of all Polish lighthouses, a popular attraction for families and enthusiasts.

== Technical data ==
- Light characteristic:
  - Light: 0.45 s.
  - Darkness: 9.55 s.
  - Period: 10 s.
  - Get this on a pdf

== See also ==
- List of lighthouses in Poland
