= Darłowo Lighthouse =

Lighthouse in Poland

Darłowo Lighthouse Latarnia Morska Darłowo
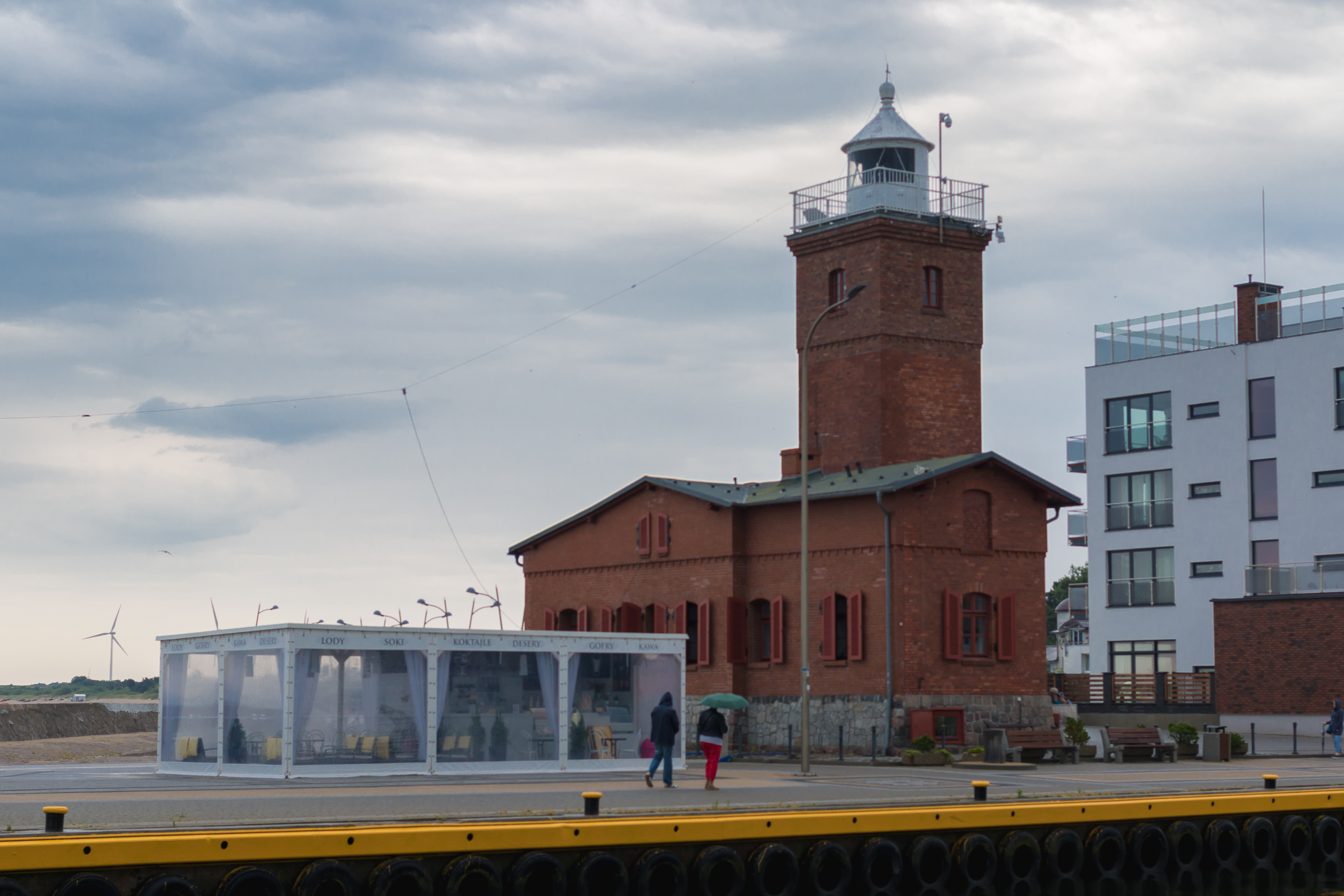
- Location: Darłowo; West Pomeranian Voivodeship; Poland
- Coordinates: 54°26′25.1″N 16°22′43.1″E

Tower
- Constructed: 1715 (first)
- Construction: brick
- Height: 21 metres (69 ft)
- Shape: square tower with balcony attached to the front pilot house
- Markings: unpainted tower, white balcony and lantern
- Operator: Port Darłowo
- Heritage: cultural property protection in Poland

Light
- First lit: 1885 (current)
- Focal height: 19.70 metres (64.6 ft)
- Lens: Fresnel lens
- Range: 15 miles (24 km)
- Characteristic: Oc(2) W 15s

Darłowo Lighthouse (Polish: Latarnia Morska Darłowo) – a lighthouse on the Polish coast of the Baltic Sea in Darłowo, West Pomeranian Voivodeship; in Poland.

The lighthouse is located between Gąski (about 40 km to the west) and the Jarosławiec (about 15 km to the east).

== History ==
The first mention of Darłowo Lighthouse is from 1715 when the city council ordered lights to be installed on both sides of the mouth of the river Wieprz. These light installations remained for many years, until 1885 when brick harbour port station was built at the base of the eastern breakwater – to which the tower was square tower. The lighthouse was topped with a red light which had a range of about 6 nautical miles.

The lighthouse was expanded and renovated in 1927, when an extra floor was added to the lighthouse – made out of a metal frame – used as the main lantern room housing an optic with a prism assembled on the thirteenth level of the lighthouse. A twin light source was installed with a changer, each bulb having a power output of 1000 watts. This was the last time the lighthouse upgraded. Only during the modernisation in 1996 was the light source changed for 100 watt halogen bulbs with a six-bulb changer.

Currently the lighthouse is 21 metres in height – with a range of 30 nmi, signaling the way to the port. The lighthouse is open to the public and can be reached by crossing the river Wieprz by a drawbridge.

== Technical data ==
- Light characteristic
  - Light: 2 s.
  - Darkness: 3 s.
  - Light: 2 s.
  - Darkness: 8 s.
  - Period: 15 s.

== See also ==
- List of lighthouses in Poland
