= Kołobrzeg Lighthouse =

Lighthouse in Poland

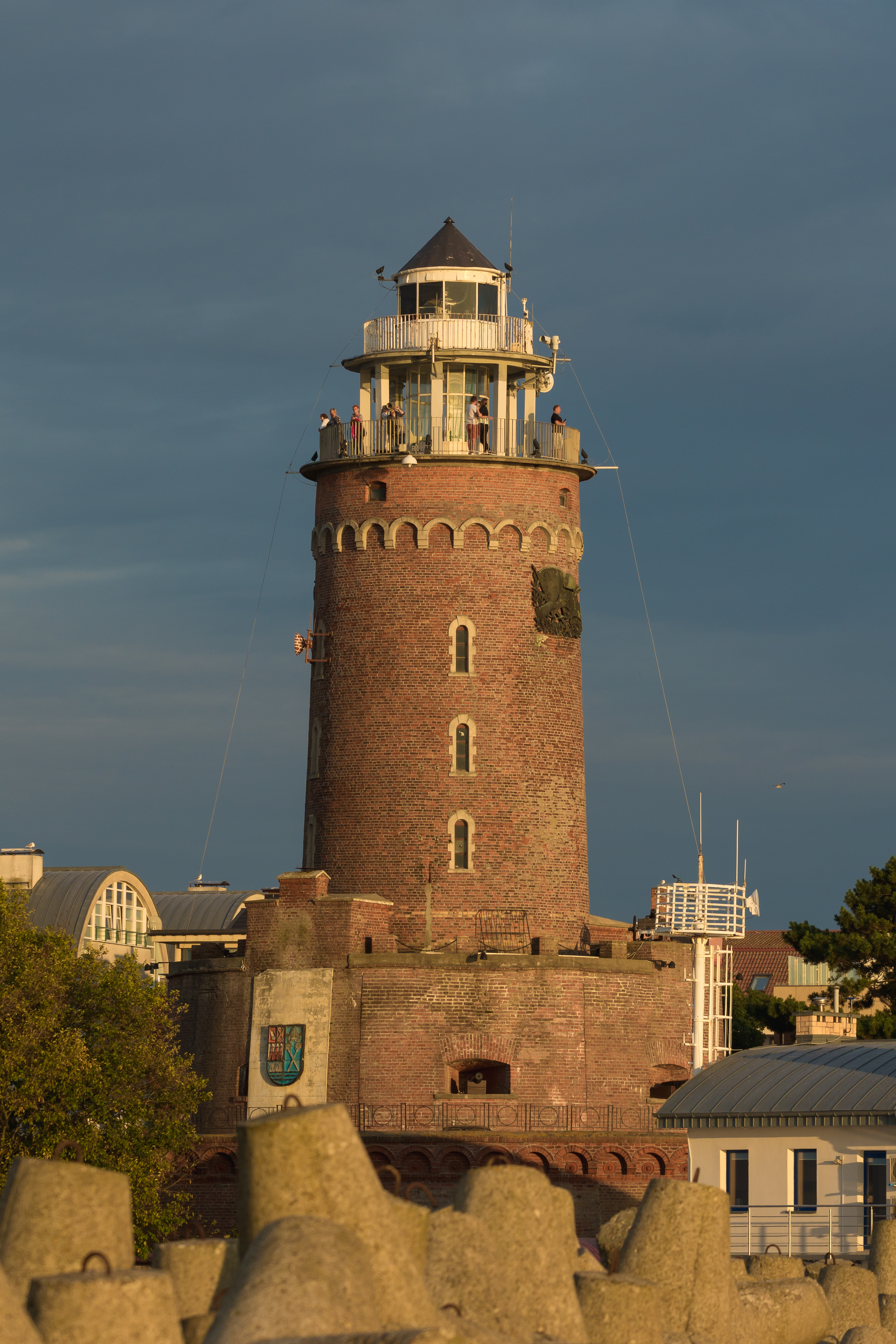
- Location: Kołobrzeg; West Pomeranian Voivodeship; Poland
- Coordinates: 54°11′11.0″N 15°33′15.3″E

Tower
- Constructed: 1899 (first); 1909 (second)
- Construction: brick tower
- Height: 26 metres (85 ft)
- Shape: cylindrical tower with double balcony and lantern
- Markings: unpainted tower, white lantern
- Heritage: immovable monument in Poland

Light
- First lit: 1948 (current)
- Focal height: 33 metres (108 ft)
- Range: 16 nautical miles (30 km; 18 mi)
- Characteristic: Fl W 3s.

Kołobrzeg Lighthouse (Polish: Latarnia Morska Kołobrzeg; German: Der Leuchtturm Kolberg) is a lighthouse in Kołobrzeg on the Polish coast of the Baltic Sea, located in Kołobrzeg (West Pomeranian Voivodeship), in north-west Poland.

The lighthouse is located in between the lighthouse in Niechorze (about 34 km to the west) and the lighthouse in Gąski (22 km to the east), at the entrance to the Port of Kołobrzeg, it stands on the right bank of the river Parsęta.

== History ==
The history of the Kołobrzeg Lighthouse dates back to 1666.

In World War II the lighthouse was blown up by German engineers as it was a good look-out point for the Polish artillery in March 1945.

After the Second World War the lighthouse was built at a slightly different location from the original, using the foundations of the fort buildings complex located close to the town. The lighthouse is 26 metres tall, with the range of its light glare being 29.6 kilometres.

In 1981 the lighthouse was renovated and the 50 cm diameter lens was replaced by a rotating set of halogen bulbs. The wooden staircase was also replaced by a metal one. The base of the lighthouse houses a mineral rock museum.

In December 2022, as part of a nationwide decommunization effort, symbols of Soviet domination were removed from the lighthouse.

== Technical data ==
- Light characteristic
  - Light: 1 s.
  - Darkness: 2 s.
  - Period: 3 s.

== See also ==
- List of lighthouses in Poland
