= Jarosławiec Lighthouse =

Lighthouse in Poland

Jarosławiec Lighthouse Jershöft
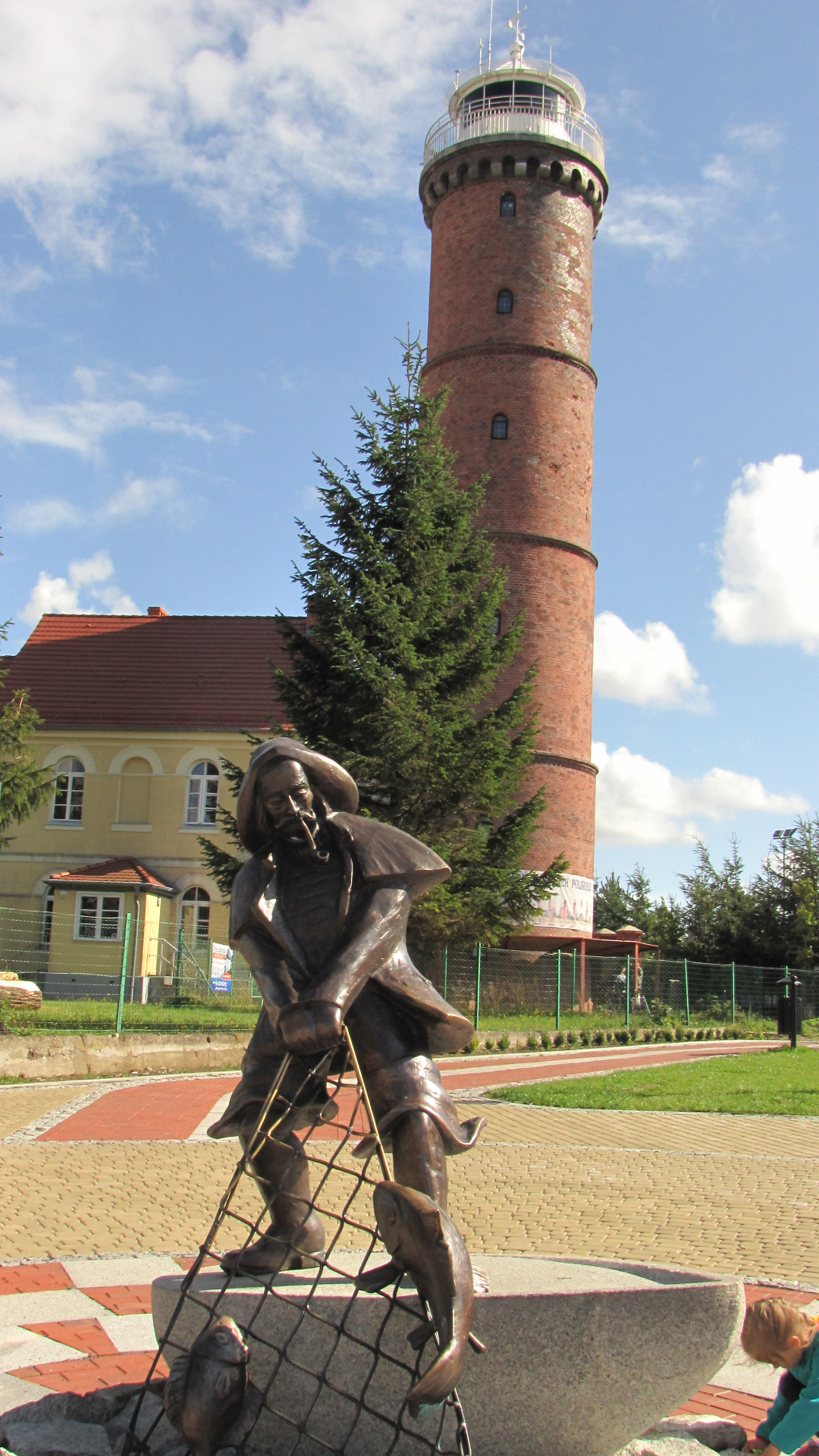
- Location: Jarosławiec; West Pomeranian Voivodeship; Poland
- Coordinates: 54°32′23.1″N 16°32′32.3″E

Tower
- Constructed: 1830 (first)
- Construction: brick tower
- Height: 33.30 metres (109.3 ft)
- Shape: four-stage cylindrical tower with balcony and lantern
- Markings: unpaited tower, white lantern
- Heritage: immovable monument in Poland

Light
- First lit: 1838 (current)
- Focal height: 50.20 metres (164.7 ft)
- Range: 23 nautical miles (43 km; 26 mi)
- Characteristic: Fl (2) W 9s.

Jarosławiec Lighthouse (Polish: Latarnia Morska Jarosławiec) is a lighthouse located on the Polish coast of the Baltic Sea. The lighthouse is located in Jarosławiec, West Pomeranian Voivodeship; in Poland.

The lighthouse is located in between the Darłowo (15 km to the west), and the lighthouse in Ustka.

== History ==
The lighthouse in Jarosławiec is the oldest lighthouse in Poland. Its construction began in 1835 however the lighthouse was not successful due to a number of physical factors. The lighthouse was built about 400 metres from the coast – this proved to be too low to be effective for navigation. Its light was not very visible because it was obscured by trees and it was soon decided to build a new tower closer to the beach. The new lighthouse began operating in 1838. Its light source was fifteen lamps powered by rapeseed oil. This unusual form of lighting was used for a long time until it was replaced at the beginning of the 20th century with electric lighting. The lighthouse is part of a complex of buildings, including the operator's living quarters, the lighthouse is 33.3 m in height. The light is located at a height of 50.2m above sea level and with a range of 23 nautical miles. The lighthouse, located in Jaroslawiec is a characteristic of the village – open to tourists. Nearby there is also the preserved and renovated formerly used lighthouse.

== Technical data ==
- Light characteristic
  - Light: 0.45 s.
  - Darkness: 2.05 s.
  - Light: 0.45 s.
  - Darkness: 6.05 s.
  - Period: 9 s.

== See also ==
- List of lighthouses in Poland
