= Jastarnia Lighthouse =

Lighthouse in Poland

Jastarnia Lighthouse Latarnia Morska Jastarnia
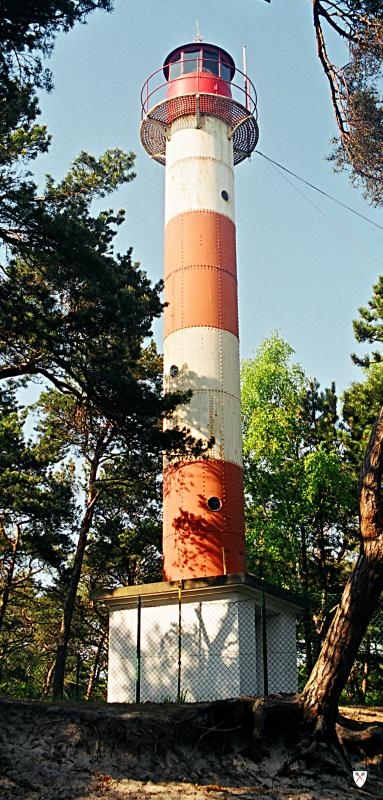
- Location: Jastarnia; Pomeranian Voivodeship; Poland
- Coordinates: 54°42′00.9″N 18°40′53.9″E

Tower
- Constructed: 1938 (first)
- Construction: steel tower
- Height: 17 metres (56 ft)
- Shape: cylindrical tower with balcony and lantern
- Markings: white and red bands tower, red lantern

Light
- First lit: 1950 (current)
- Focal height: 22 metres (72 ft)
- Range: 15 nautical miles (28 km; 17 mi)
- Characteristic: Iso W 4s.

Jastarnia Lighthouse (Polish: Latarnia Morska Jastarnia) is a lighthouse in Jastarnia on the Polish coast of the Baltic Sea. The lighthouse is located in Jastarnia, Pomeranian Voivodeship on the Hel Peninsula.

The lighthouse in Jastarnia is located between the lighthouse in Rozewie and the lighthouse in Hel.

== Technical data ==
- Light characteristic
  - Light: 2 s.
  - Darkness: 2 s.
  - Light: 7 s.
  - Darkness: 9 s.
  - Period: 20 s.

== See also ==
- List of lighthouses in Poland
