= Czołpino Lighthouse =

Lighthouse in Poland

Czołpino Lighthouse Latarnia Morska Czołpino
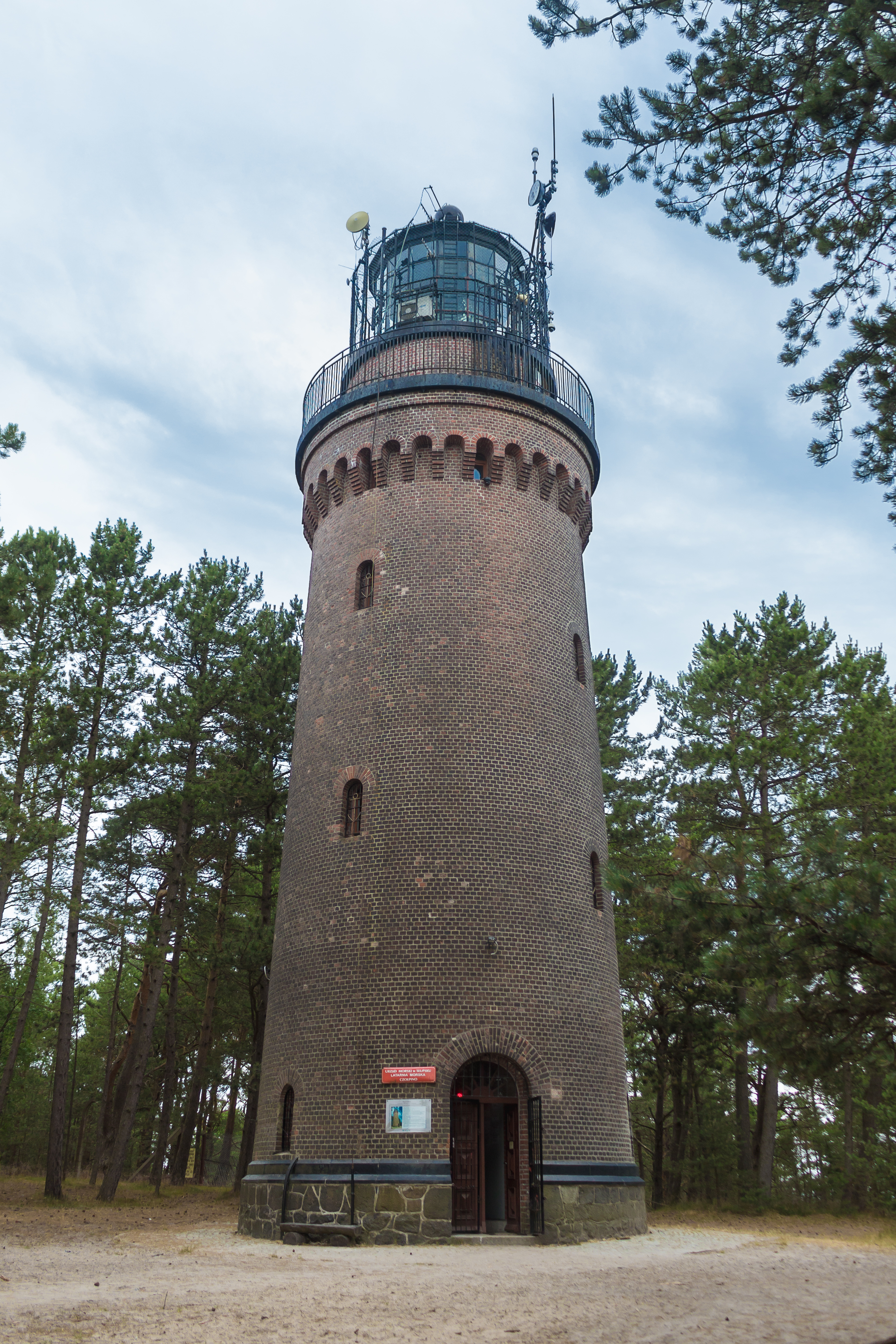
- Location: Czołpino; Pomeranian Voivodeship; Poland
- Coordinates: 54°43′05.7″N 17°14′28.9″E

Tower
- Constructed: 1875
- Construction: brick tower
- Height: 25.2 metres (83 ft)
- Shape: cylindrical tower with balcony and lantern
- Markings: unpainted tower, white observation room, black lantern dome
- Operator: Urząd Morski w Słupsku
- Heritage: immovable monument in Poland

Light
- Focal height: 75 metres (246 ft)
- Lens: hyperradiant Fresnel lens
- Range: 21 metres (69 ft)
- Characteristic: LFl Fl W 8s.

Czołpino Lighthouse (Polish: Latarnia Morska Czołpino) is a lighthouse located on the Polish coast of the Baltic Sea, located to the north of the village of Czołpino, Pomeranian Voivodeship.

The lighthouse is located between Ustka's and Stilo's lighthouses.

== History ==
The lighthouse's construction was completed on 15 January 1875. On top of the tower, there is an optical device made in France, from 1926. The lighthouse has a drum lens, made from forty-three prismatic crystals.

== See also ==
- List of lighthouses in Poland
