= Krynica Morska Lighthouse =

Lighthouse in Poland

Krynica Morska Lighthouse Kahlberg
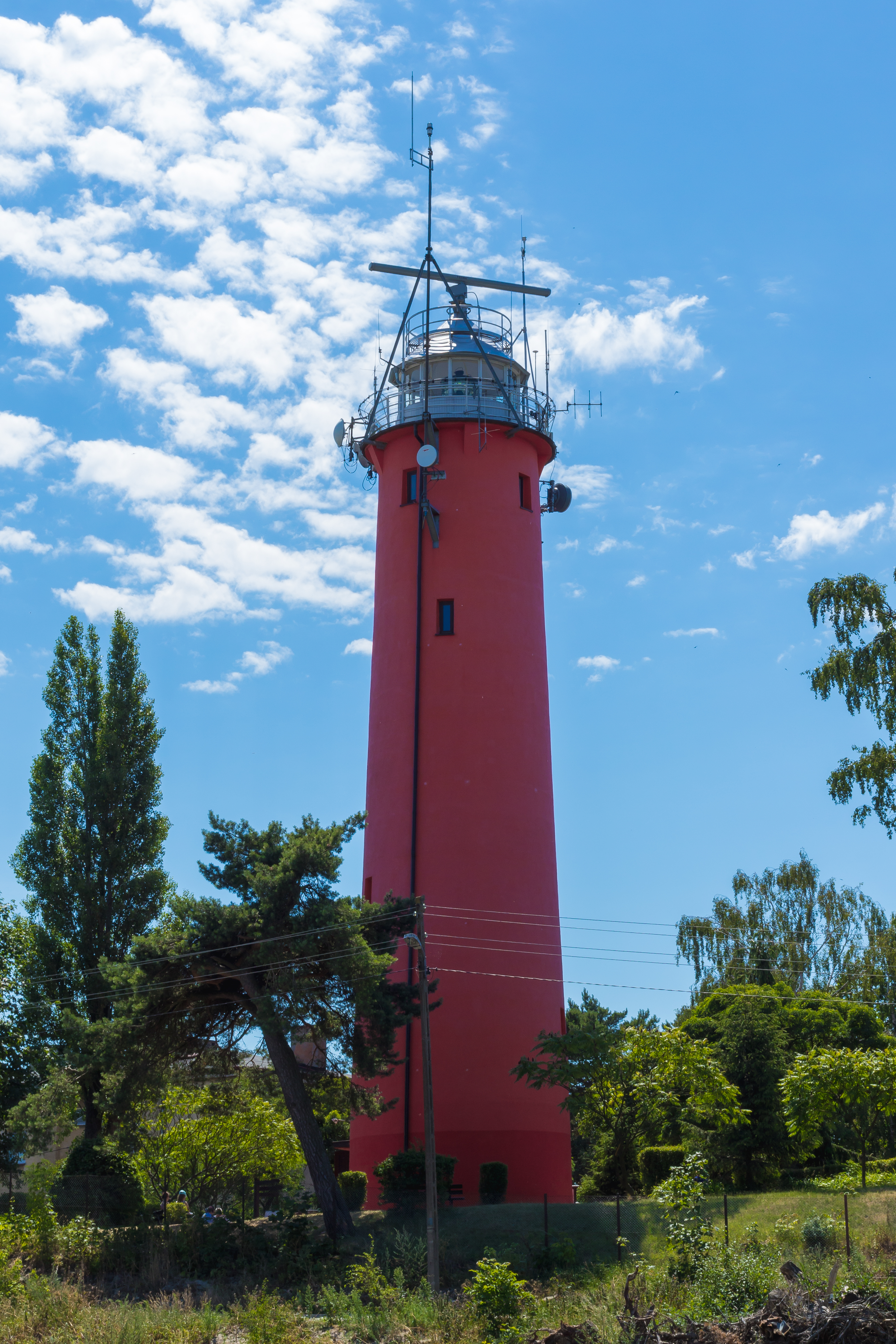
- Location: Krynica Morska; Pomeranian Voivodship; Poland
- Coordinates: 54°23′07.3″N 19°27′02.8″E

Tower
- Constructed: 1895 (first)
- Construction: cement blocks
- Height: 27 metres (89 ft)
- Shape: cylindrical tower with balcony and lantern
- Markings: orange-red tower, white lantern
- Power source: mains electricity

Light
- First lit: 1951 (current)
- Deactivated: 1945–1951
- Focal height: 53 metres (174 ft)
- Range: 18 nautical miles (33 km; 21 mi)
- Characteristic: Oc (2) W 12s.

The Krynica Morska Lighthouse is an active lighthouse in the town of Krynica Morska, Pomeranian Voivodship, Poland.

== History ==
The original lighthouse was built in 1895. It had a Fresnel lens, a 2 sec on / 4 sec off characteristics, and visibility of 18 nautical miles. The source was an oil-fueled flame, converted in 1938 to electric light. This original lighthouse was destroyed in 1945 after being mined by retreating German forces. A new lighthouse, now open to visitors, was built in 1951. Adjacent to it is a small cemetery with a monument to the Soviet soldiers killed in the explosion that destroyed the original building.

== See also ==
- List of lighthouses in Poland
