= Kikut Lighthouse =

Lighthouse in Poland

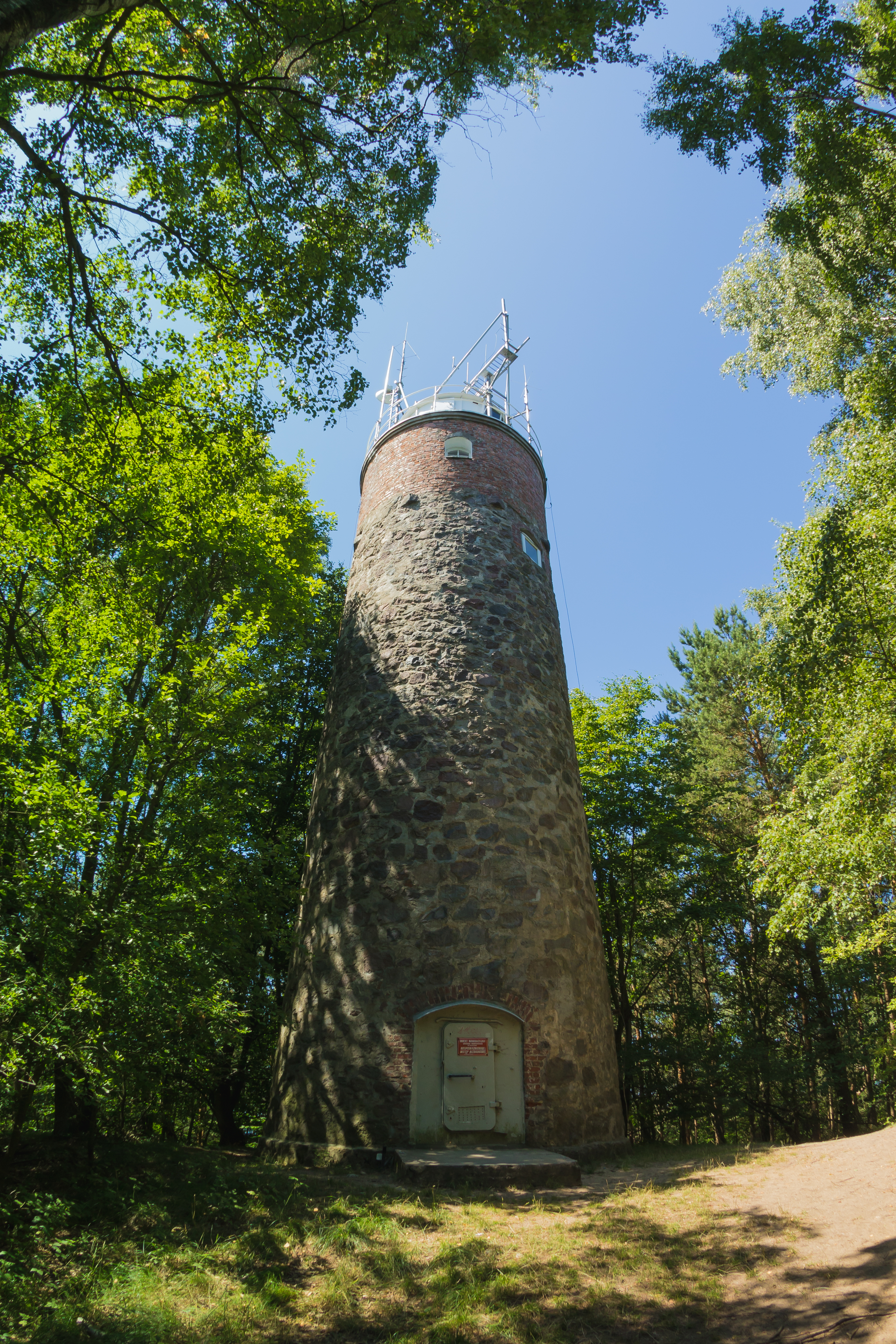
- Location: Wolin National Park; West Pomeranian Voivodeship; Poland
- Coordinates: 53°58′53.5″N 14°34′49.7″E

Tower
- Constructed: 1826 (first)
- Construction: rubble masonry tower
- Automated: 1962
- Height: 18 metres (59 ft)
- Shape: cylindrical tower with balcony and lantern
- Markings: unpainted tower, white lantern
- Operator: Woliński Park Narodowy

Light
- First lit: 1962 (current)
- Focal height: 91.5 metres (300 ft)
- Range: 16 nautical miles (30 km; 18 mi)
- Characteristic: Iso W 10s.

Kikut Lighthouse (German: Kieckturm) is a lighthouse in the north of Poland on the Baltic Sea coast that is active since 1962. It is the highest light on Poland's coast.

The lighthouse is situated near the village Wisełka on the island of Wolin and can only be reached via footpaths, which are steep at the end.

== History ==
The lighthouse was built on the base of an ancient view tower, the Kiekturm. It is one of the few Polish lighthouses which can't be visited. Its light is visible from the neighbouring island of Usedom.

The former lighthouse was built in 1826. It was originally a 19th-century stone lookout tower. An upper level made of brick and a lantern were added and it was converted into a lighthouse in 1962. The lighthouse is located in Wolin National Park.

Height of building: 18.2 m
Height of fire: 91.5 m
Range of light white 16 smC
Characteristic [Iso W 10s] five seconds light – five seconds dark
Int. No.: C 2892

"Poland has at least 26 lighthouses on its Baltic coast and many lighthouses on the inland waterway that extends from Świnoujście to Szczecin."

== See also ==
- List of lighthouses in Poland
