= Gąski Lighthouse =

Lighthouse in Poland

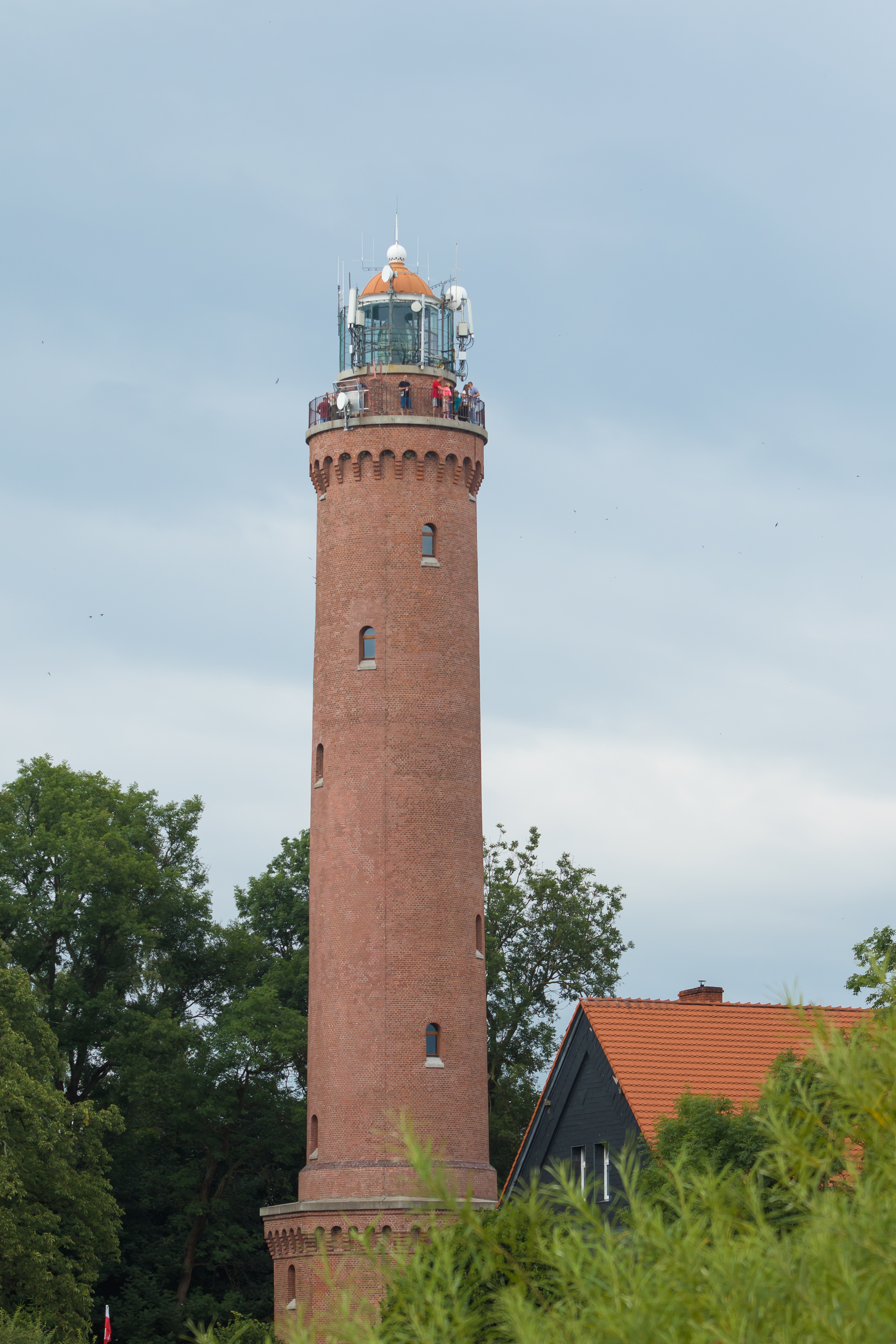
- Location: Gąski, West Pomeranian Voivodeship, Poland
- Coordinates: 54°14′34.3″N 15°52′21.9″E

Tower
- Constructed: 1878
- Construction: brick tower
- Height: 49.80 metres (163.4 ft)
- Shape: cylindrical tower, rising from an octagonal prism basement, with balcony and lantern
- Markings: unpainted tower, orange lantern dome
- Heritage: cultural property protection in Poland

Light
- Focal height: 51.10 metres (167.7 ft)
- Lens: first order Fresnel lens
- Range: 23.5 miles (37.8 km)
- Characteristic: Oc (3) W 15s.

Gąski Lighthouse (Polish: Latarnia morska Gąski) is a lighthouse located in Gąski, on the Polish coast of the Baltic Sea. The lighthouse is located in Gąski, West Pomeranian Voivodeship, in Poland.

== History ==
The lighthouse is located about 100 metres from the coast of the Baltic Sea; situated next to the road between Ustronie Morskie and Mielno. The construction of the lighthouse began in 1876 and was completed about two years later, in 1878. Built from red bricks, the lighthouse has a height of 41.2 metres, with the lighthouse's light having a focal height of 50.1 metres.

Originally it was fitted with a Fresnel lens with the light source provided by kerosene lamps. The intermittent beam was achieved by three screens rotated by a clock-work mechanism. In 1927 the kerosene lamps were replaced by electric lamp. In 1948, after the Second World War, the lighthouse was reactivated and the clock mechanism was replaced by an electric motor, with the rotation frequency changed from 12 to 15 seconds. The current range of the lighthouse's light glare is about 43.5 kilometres.

The lighthouse is open to the public, allowing tourists to access its top view point. From here there are panoramic views of the Baltic Sea, where one can see the nearby settlements of Sarbinowo, Chłopy, Mielno, and Unieście, all of which are nearby resort towns and villages. At the base of the tower there is the lighthouse keeper's living quarters.

== Technical data ==
- Light characteristic
  - Darkness: 1.2 s.
  - Light: 2.5 s.
  - Darkness: 1.2 s.
  - Light: 2.5 s
  - Darkness: 1.2 s.
  - Light: 6.4 s.
  - Period: 15 s.

== See also ==
- List of lighthouses in Poland
