= Hel Lighthouse =

Lighthouse in Poland

Hel Lighthouse Latarnia Morska Hel
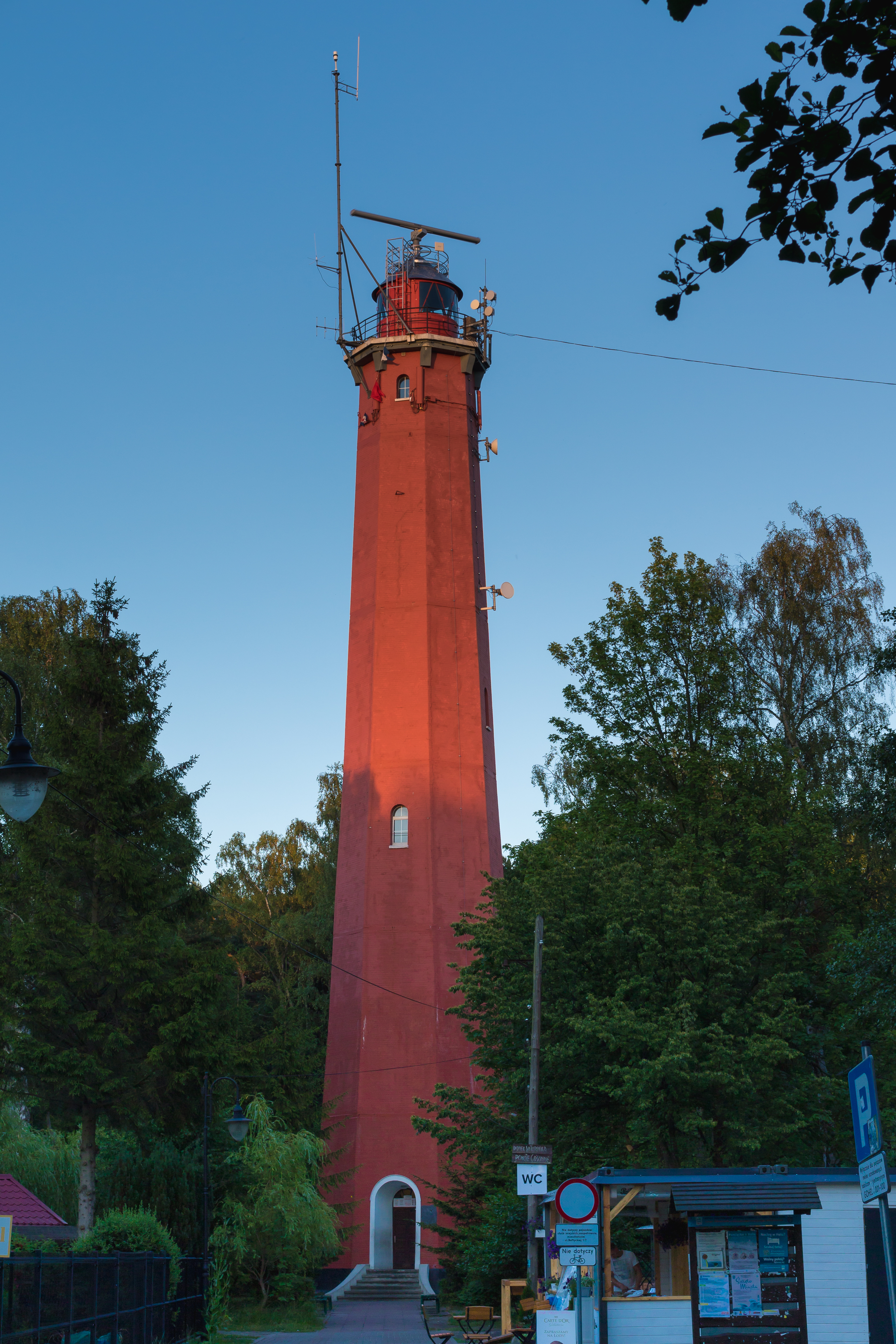
- Location: Hel; Pomeranian Voivodeship; Poland
- Coordinates: 54°36′00.1″N 18°48′46.6″E

Tower
- Constructed: 1670 (first); 1790 (second); 1827 (third)
- Height: 40 metres (130 ft)
- Shape: tapered octagonal tower with balcony and lantern
- Markings: red tower and lantern
- Heritage: immovable monument in Poland

Light
- First lit: 1942 (current)
- Focal height: 41 metres (135 ft)
- Range: 17 miles (27 km)
- Characteristic: Iso W 5s.

Hel Lighthouse (Polish: Latarnia Morska Hel) is an active lighthouse in the town of Hel, Pomeranian Voivodeship in Poland. It is situated at the eastern tip of the Hel Peninsula and guides ship traffic into Gdańsk Bay and the Bay of Puck.

== History ==
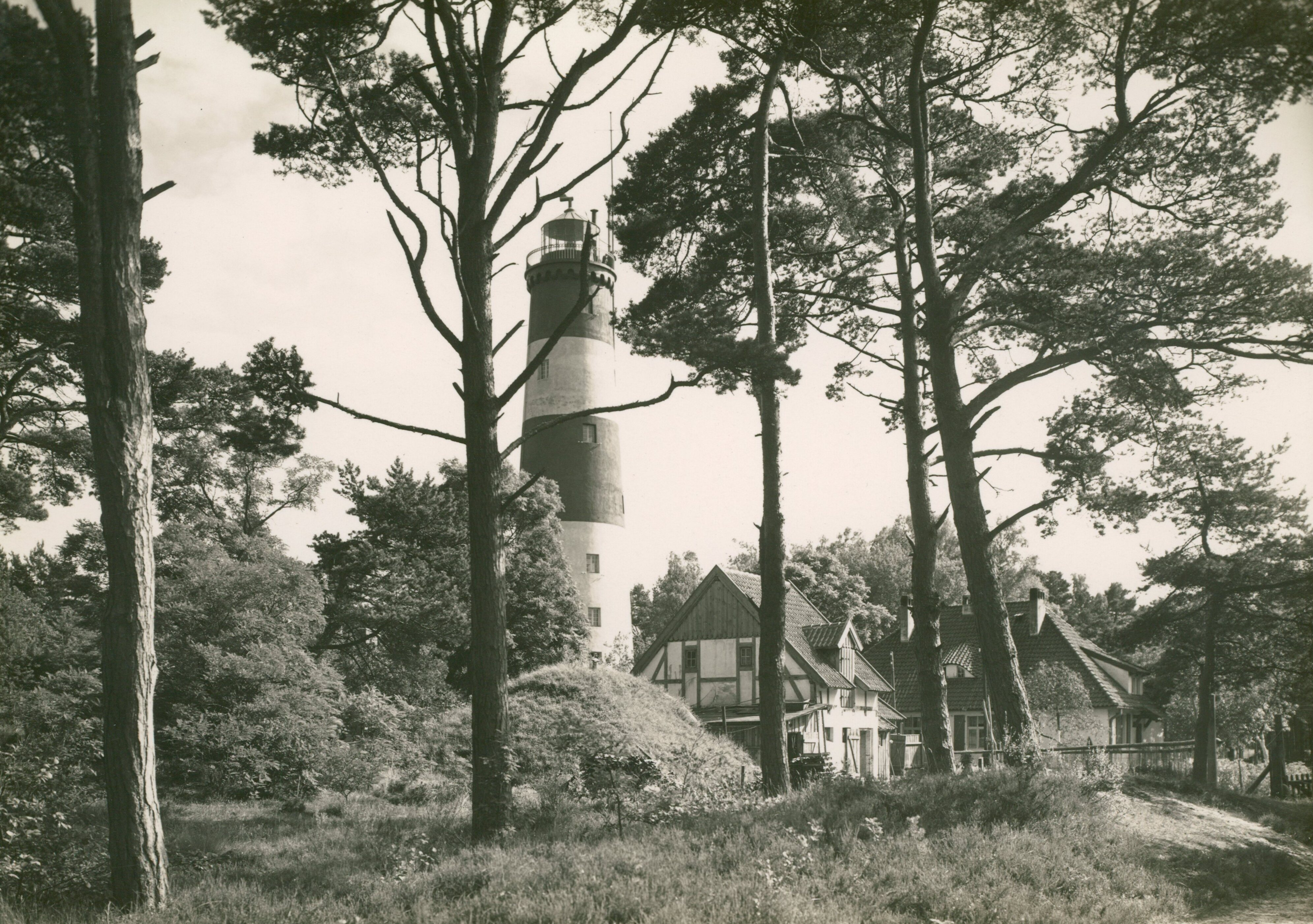
The lighthouse in the 1930s

The lighthouse on Hel has its origins in the 16th century when a fire was lit on the church tower at a height of 116 ft (35 m) to guide ships. The structure burned down. In 1638 locals asked Gdańsk authorities to build a lighthouse on the peninsula. After deliberation, a wooden structure was erected circa 1640, with a range of about 6 mi (9.7 km). This lighthouse burned down in 1667.

Two further attempts at construction failed as well. However, seafaring in this area of the Baltic remained hazardous, so around 1790 another effort was made. A site was allocated, including a lighthouse-keeper's residence. The light was to be lit every day.

Though effectiveness improved, the lighthouse soon faced the problem of being obscured by growing trees. The construction of the first brick lighthouse started in 1806. Due to civil wars the effort dragged on until 1826.

The brick lighthouse wasn't high enough and ships continued to sink between Jastarnia and Hel. A cannon was placed at the lighthouse, fired every four minutes, as a sound signal. This continued until the gunner died in 1910. A stone commemorates the event to this day.

More improvements followed. The light source switched to a paraffin lamp and the structure was renovated. Electric light was installed in 1938 in the form of a 3000 watt bulb. During World War II Germans decided to take down the structure, since it presented a perfect target for air raids.

In 1942 Germans ordered locals to erect a new lighthouse. It stood 10 meters to the southeast from the old one (now demolished). The new structure was modern, powered by electricity, and it's been in operation to this day.

The 40.8-meter tower is painted red and octagonal in shape. The light source is a 1000 watt bulb, set 38.5 meters above sea level, with a range of 17 miles. The lighthouse is also a part of an air traffic control system.

The lighthouse is a tourist attraction and open to the public during summer. Apart from the lighthouse itself, a few keeper houses remain, dating back to 19th century. Facing west, inland, one can see the Swedish Hill with an old lighthouse built during World War II to replace the one destroyed in Hel at the same time.

== Climate ==
Climate data for Hel, Poland (near of Hel Lighthouse), elevation: 1 m, 1961–1990 normals and extremes
Month	Jan	Feb	Mar	Apr	May	Jun	Jul	Aug	Sep	Oct	Nov	Dec	Year
Record high °C (°F)	10.0 (50.0)	12.9 (55.2)	20.5 (68.9)	21.8 (71.2)	28.0 (82.4)	31.2 (88.2)	33.2 (91.8)	31.8 (89.2)	27.3 (81.1)	23.2 (73.8)	15.9 (60.6)	11.1 (52.0)	33.2 (91.8)
Mean daily maximum °C (°F)	0.9 (33.6)	1.3 (34.3)	4.6 (40.3)	9.4 (48.9)	15.0 (59.0)	19.1 (66.4)	21.1 (70.0)	21.0 (69.8)	17.3 (63.1)	12.2 (54.0)	6.6 (43.9)	3.0 (37.4)	11.0 (51.8)
Daily mean °C (°F)	−0.7 (30.7)	−0.6 (30.9)	1.7 (35.1)	5.2 (41.4)	10.3 (50.5)	14.7 (58.5)	16.9 (62.4)	16.9 (62.4)	13.7 (56.7)	9.6 (49.3)	4.9 (40.8)	1.4 (34.5)	7.8 (46.0)
Mean daily minimum °C (°F)	−2.6 (27.3)	−2.7 (27.1)	−0.8 (30.6)	1.9 (35.4)	6.2 (43.2)	10.7 (51.3)	13.3 (55.9)	13.4 (56.1)	10.8 (51.4)	7.2 (45.0)	3.1 (37.6)	−0.4 (31.3)	5.0 (41.0)
Record low °C (°F)	−19.1 (−2.4)	−16.9 (1.6)	−17.0 (1.4)	−7.0 (19.4)	−3.3 (26.1)	0.2 (32.4)	5.4 (41.7)	5.3 (41.5)	−2.3 (27.9)	−2.2 (28.0)	−8.4 (16.9)	−15.2 (4.6)	−19.1 (−2.4)
Average precipitation mm (inches)	37 (1.5)	28 (1.1)	27 (1.1)	30 (1.2)	43 (1.7)	56 (2.2)	70 (2.8)	72 (2.8)	61 (2.4)	48 (1.9)	56 (2.2)	46 (1.8)	574 (22.6)
Average precipitation days (≥ 1.0 mm)	9.3	7.9	7.7	6.8	7.7	7.7	10.0	9.0	9.8	9.3	11.4	11.0	107.6
Mean monthly sunshine hours	32	52	107	165	236	249	234	220	143	93	40	26	1,597
Source: NOAA

== Gallery ==
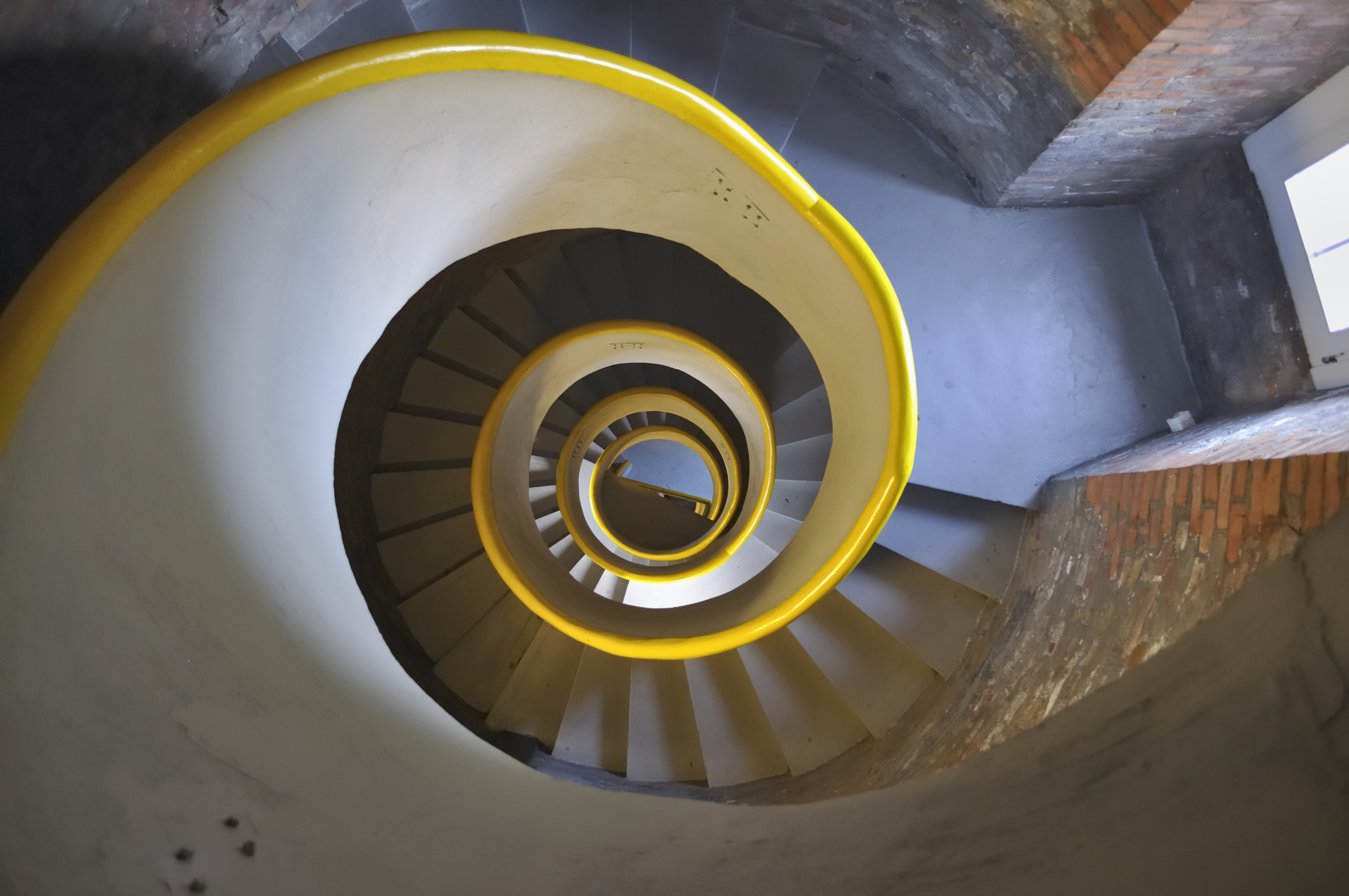
The spiral staircase (180 steps)

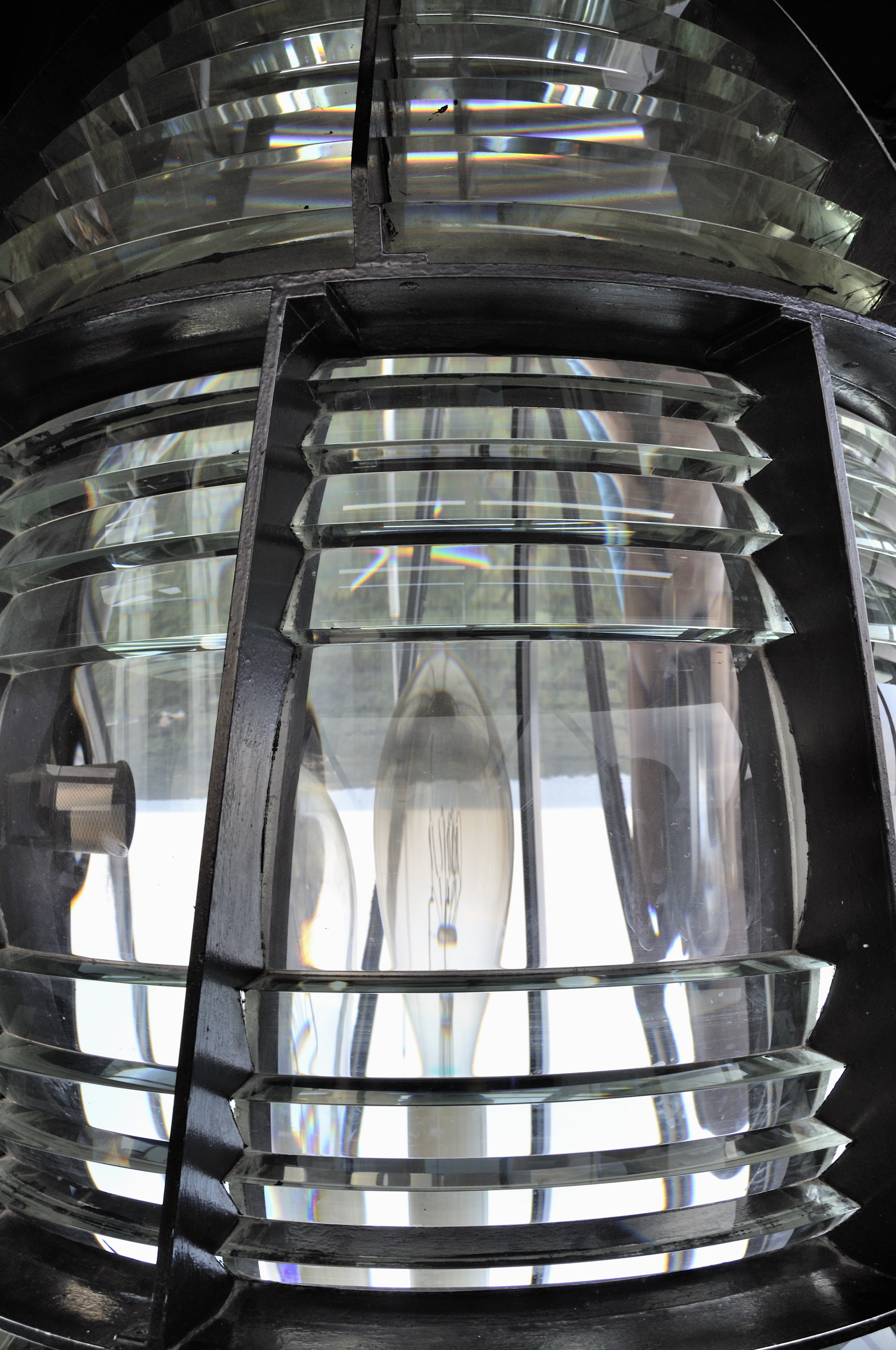
The lamp

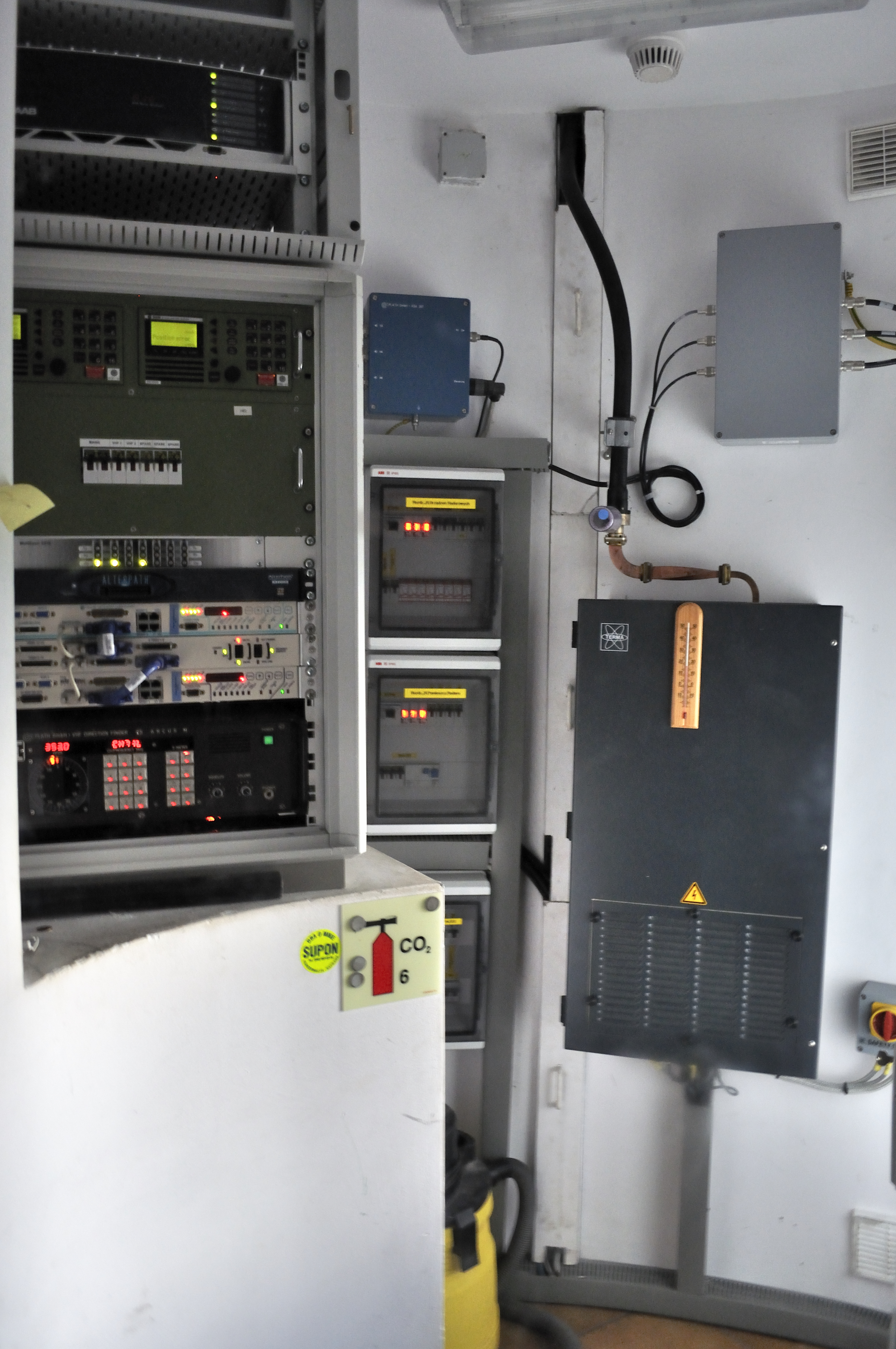
Electronics

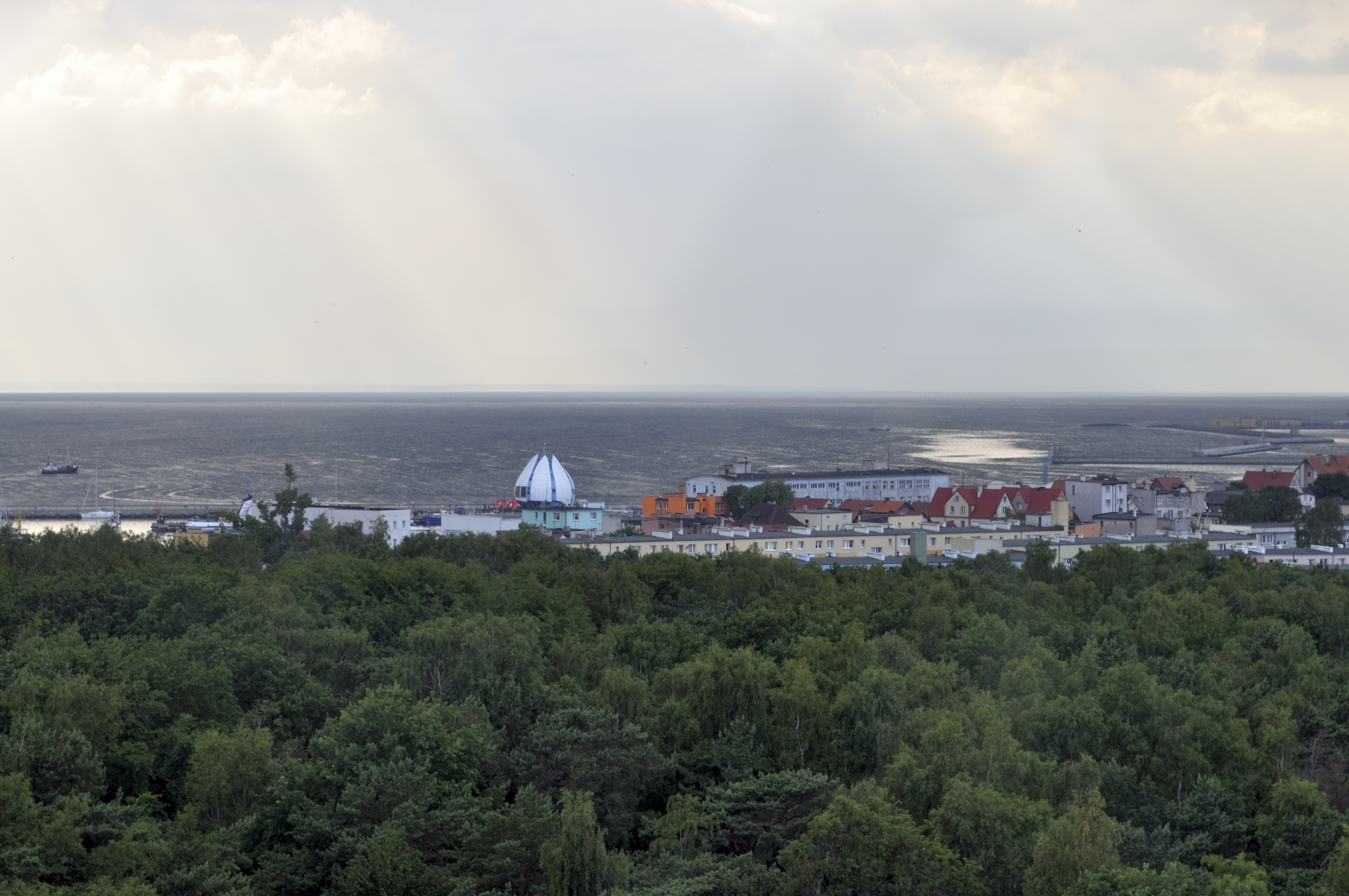
View from the lighthouse

== See also ==
- List of lighthouses in Poland
