= Gąski, Koszalin County =

Gąski
- Village
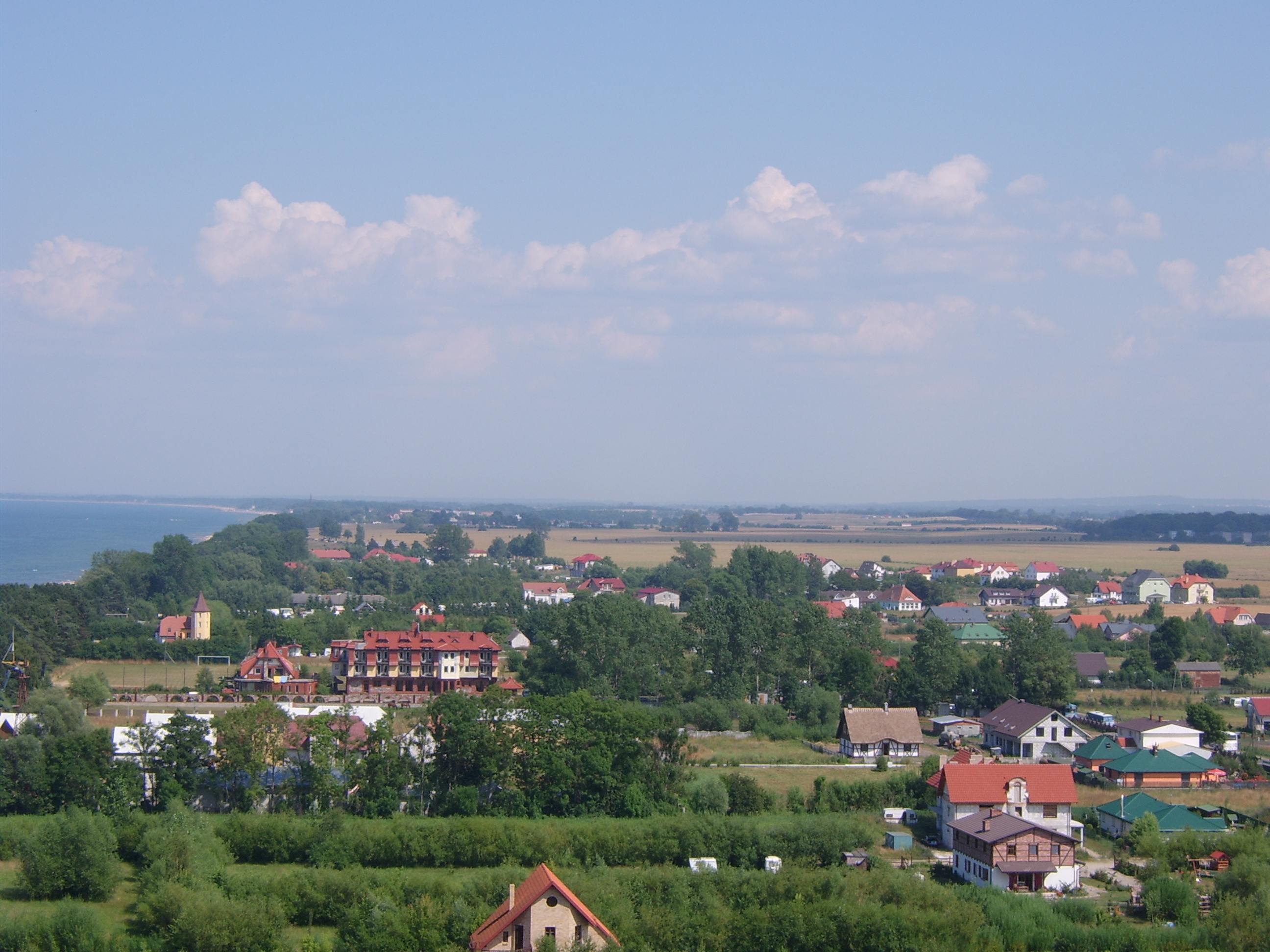

- Location within Poland
- Coordinates: 54°14′9″N 15°55′21″E
- Country: Poland
- Voivodeship: West Pomeranian
- County: Koszalin
- Gmina: Mielno
- Population: 400
- Time zone: UTC+1 (CET)
  - Summer (DST): UTC+2 (CEST)
- Vehicle registration: ZKO

Gąski [ˈɡɔ̃ski] (former German: Funkenhagen) is a village in the administrative district of Gmina Mielno, within Koszalin County, West Pomeranian Voivodeship, in north-western Poland. It lies approximately 18 km (11 mi) west of Koszalin and 127 km (79 mi) north-east of the regional capital Szczecin. It is located on the Slovincian Coast.

The village has a population of 400.

Gąski is one of the tourists' destinations on the Polish coast for its beaches and nature, aiming at sustainable development.

== Nuclear power station ==
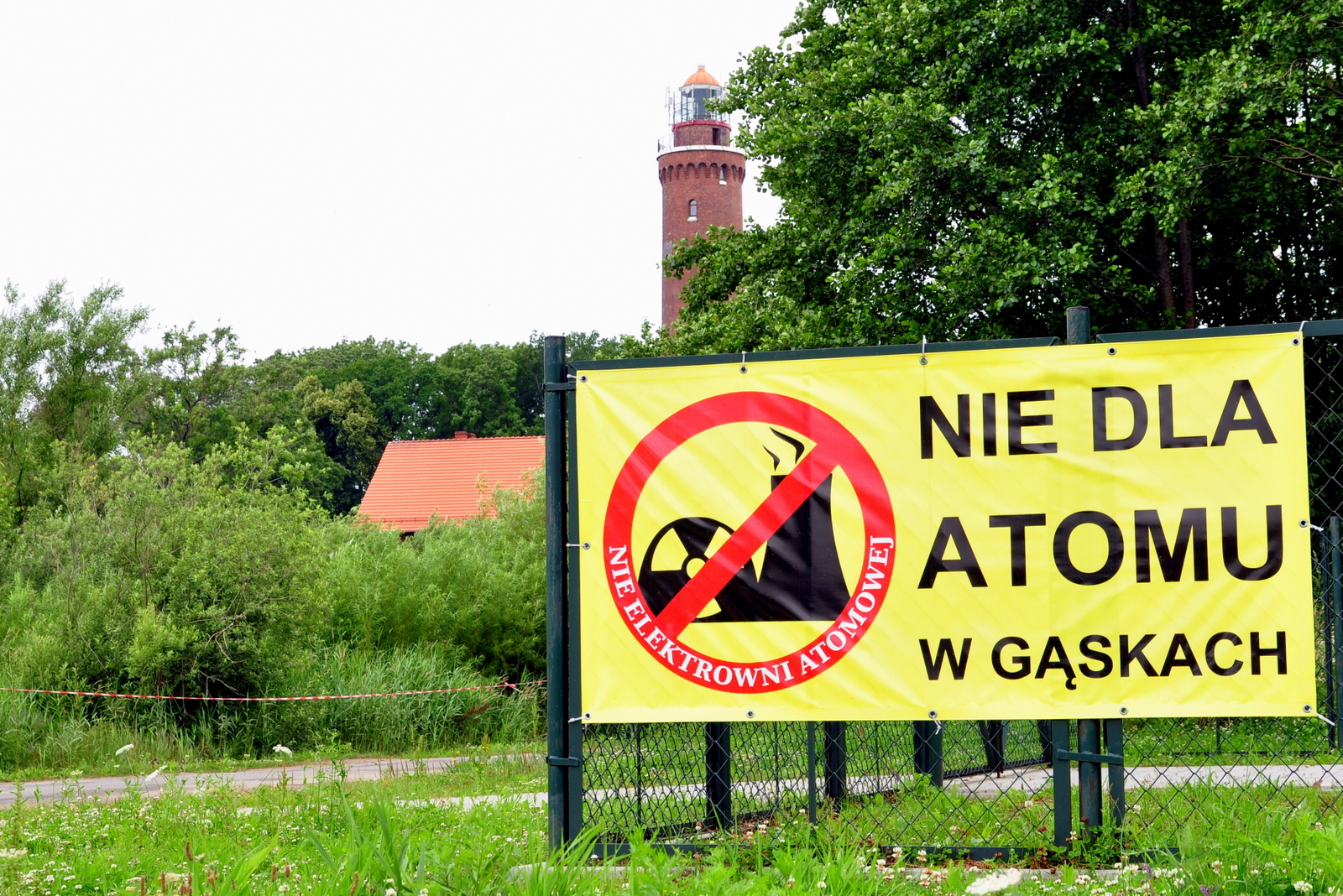
Banner in Gąski displayed by inhabitants who oppose plans of NPP construction (July 2012)

As a result of intense civic mobilisation, a referendum was held in February 2012, in which 94% of the citizens of Mielno voted against the building of a nuclear power station in the village of Gąski. The citizens' protest had been supported by members of two biggest parliamentary political groups (otherwise supportive for nuclear power): Civic Platform (Koszalin MP Marek Hok) and Law and Justice (Koszalin MP Czesław Hoc), as well as non-parliamentary Green Party and councillors of nearby city of Kołobrzeg. "Ecological Kołobrzeg" association also supported protests in 2012.

Despite the protests and referendum results, the Polish government still insists on the location of NPP in Gąski, although the entire Polish nuclear programme is on a 7-year delay (as of 2015). The first NPP is now planned not earlier than 2027 (the initial plan was 2020 and the government related its construction to goals of 2020 climate-energy package of the EU). In June 2016, state-owned energy company PGE EJ1 announced that it had withdrawn from the NPP project in Gąski.

Green Institute Foundation supports Gąski and Mielno to develop its own renewable energy capacity (prosumer, co-operative or communal) co-organising "Energy democracy" campaign together with Mielno authorities.

== See also ==
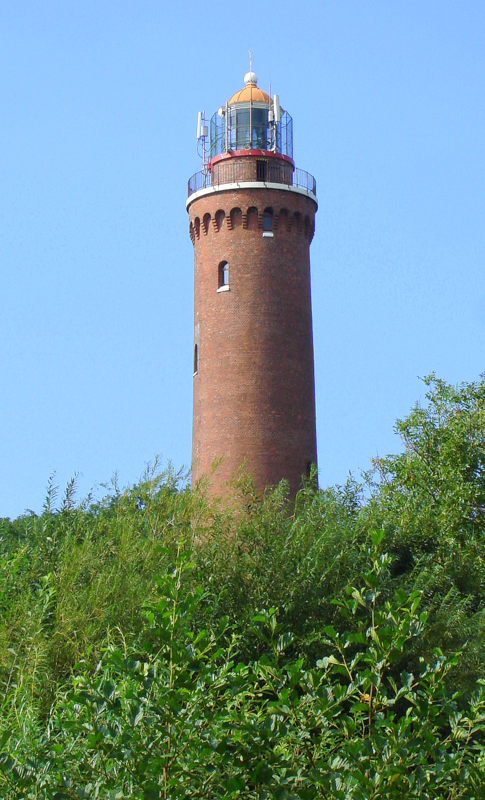
Gąski Lighthouse

- Gąski Lighthouse
