= Cape Rozewie =

Cape in Poland

Coordinates: 54°49′56″N 18°20′08″E

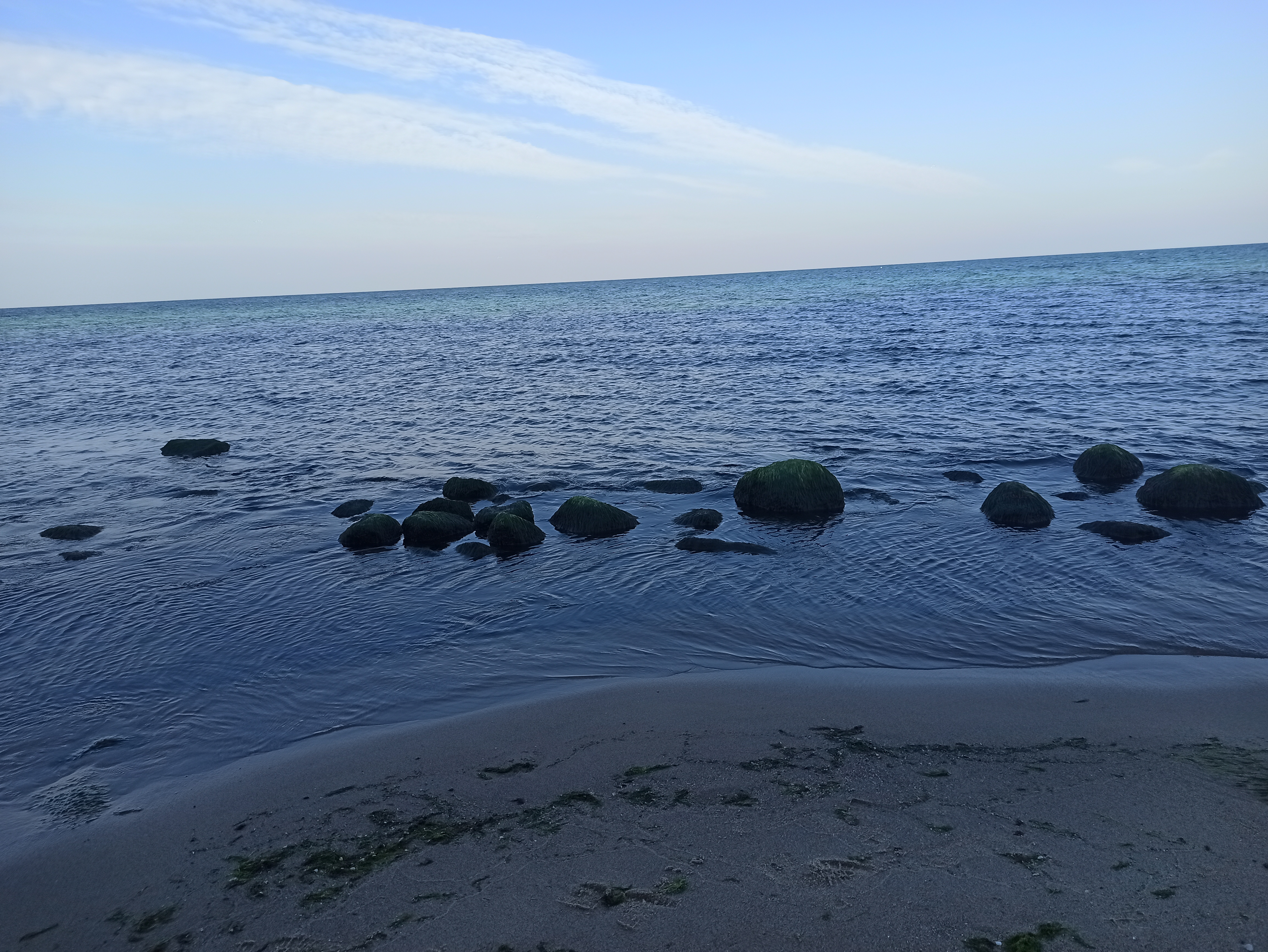
View from the northernmost area

Cape Rozewie (German: Rixhöft) is a headland on the Baltic coast of Poland, in Pomeranian Voivodeship, close to the village of Rozewie. It was formerly thought to be the most northerly point in Poland, but since measurements carried out in December 2000, that distinction is now given to a nearby beach in Jastrzębia Góra, marked by the "Northern Star" obelisk on the clifftop. Rozewie is site of a lighthouse and a nature reserve.
