= Jarosławiec, West Pomeranian Voivodeship =

Jarosławiec
- Village
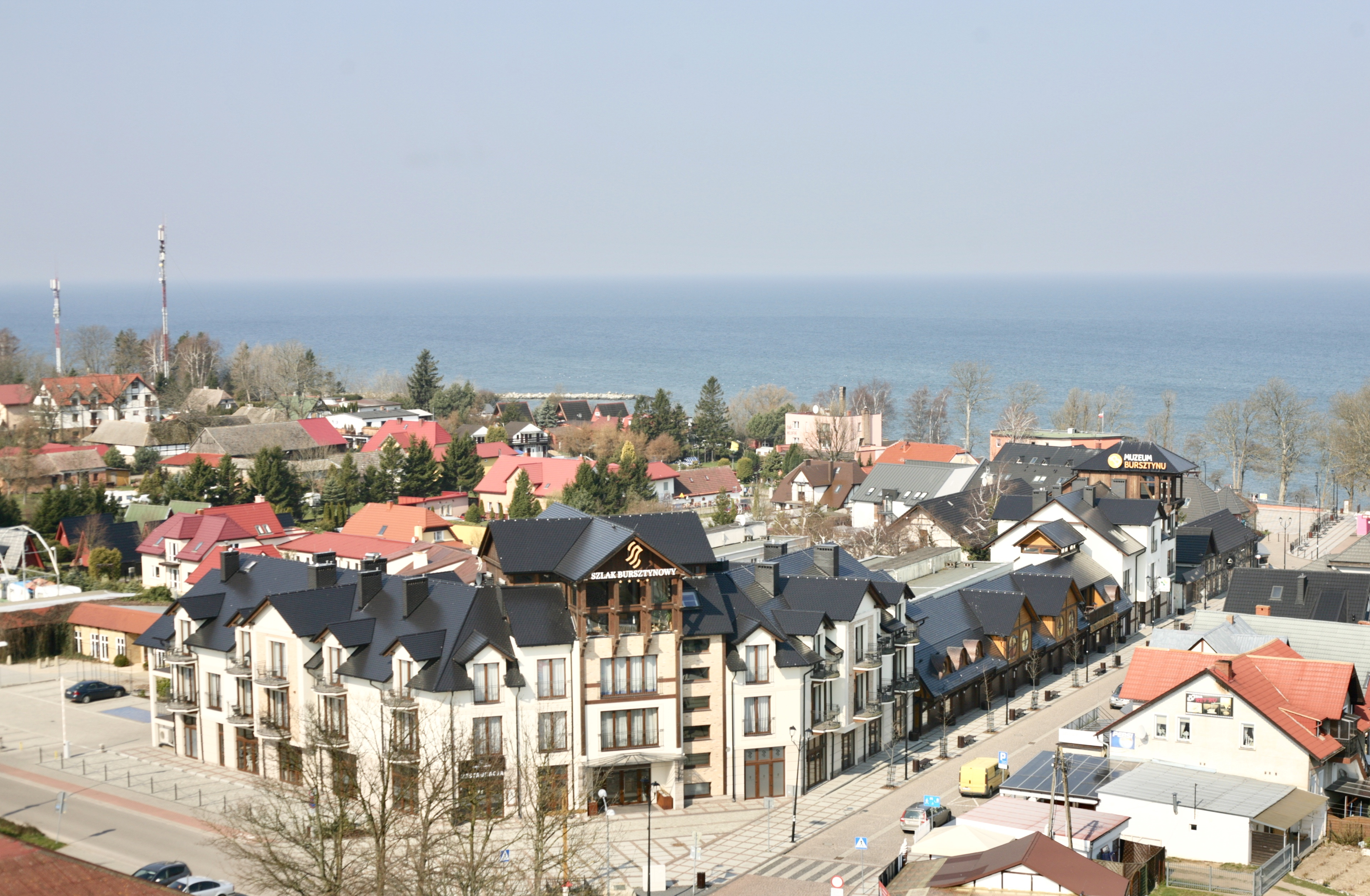
- View from Jarosławiec lighthouse

- Location within Poland
- Coordinates: 54°32′26″N 16°32′46″E
- Country: Poland
- Voivodeship: West Pomeranian
- County: Sławno
- Gmina: Postomino
- Population: 329
- Time zone: UTC+1 (CET)
  - Summer (DST): UTC+2 (CEST)
- Vehicle registration: ZSL

Jarosławiec (Polish pronunciation: [jarɔˈswavjɛt͡s]; German: Jershöft) is a village in the administrative district of Gmina Postomino, within Sławno County, West Pomeranian Voivodeship, in north-western Poland. It lies approximately 13 km (8 mi) north-west of Postomino, 22 km (14 mi) north-west of Sławno, and 180 km (112 mi) north-east of the regional capital Szczecin. It is located on the Slovincian Coast in the historic region of Pomerania.

The village has a population of 329.

== Panorama Morska ==
The Health resort & Medical SPA "Panorama Morska" in Jarosławiec is a recreational compound with an area of 10 hectares. Situated approximately 350 metres from one of the most beautiful beaches of the Polish Coast, it offers more than 400 modern rooms with private bathrooms. The biggest attraction is a large water park open all year - external swimming pool complex with hot water and sun loungers.
