= Rozewie, Pomeranian Voivodeship =

Rozewie
- Village
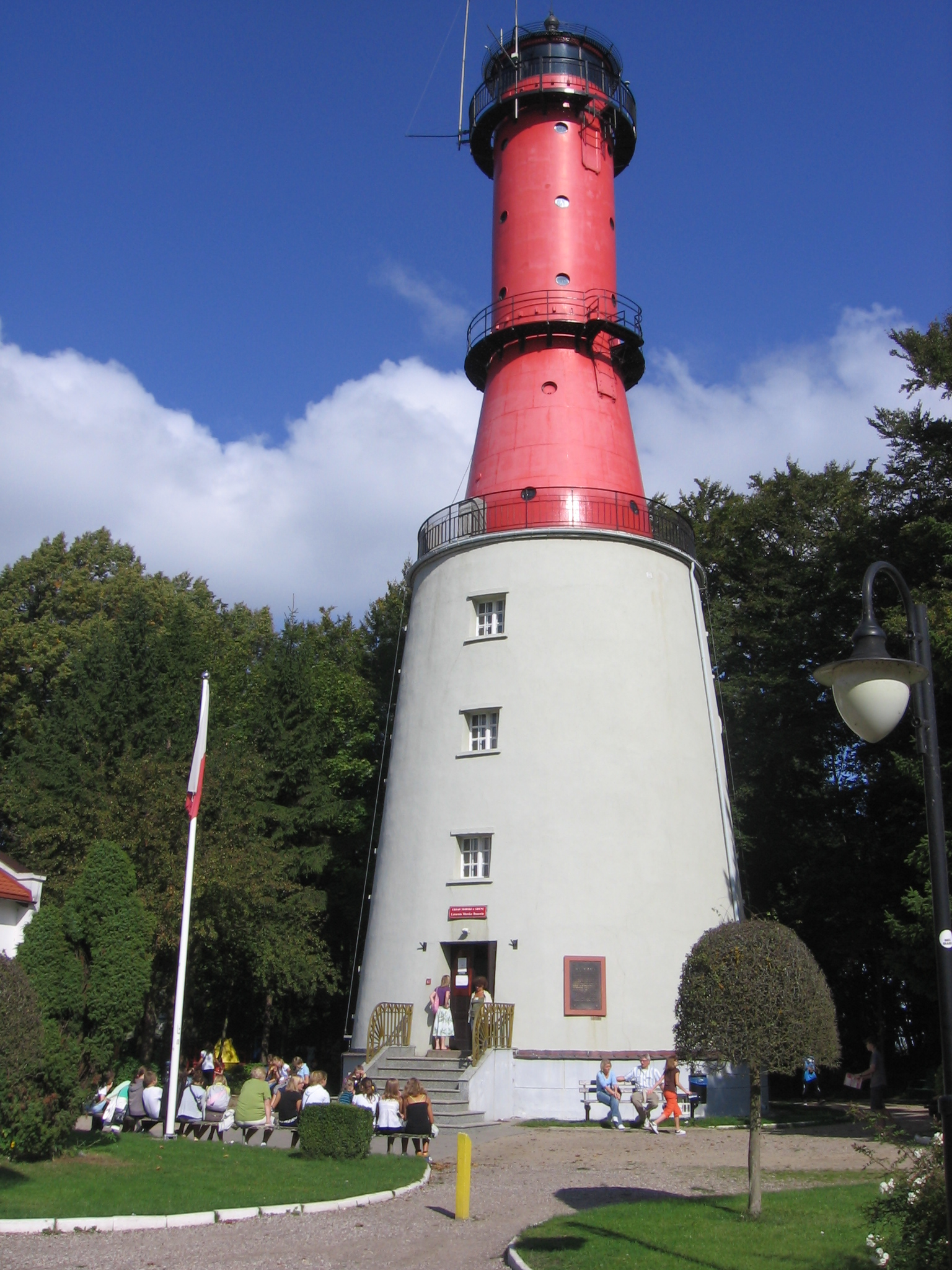
- Lighthouse

- Location within Poland
- Coordinates: 54°49′47″N 18°20′09″E
- Country: Poland
- Voivodeship: Pomeranian
- County: Puck
- Gmina: Władysławowo
- Population: 323

Rozewie (German: Rixhöft) is a village on the south coast of the Baltic Sea in the Kashubia, in the administrative district of Gmina Władysławowo, within Puck County, Pomeranian Voivodeship, in northern Poland. The nearby Cape Rozewie is named after the village. Prior to January 1, 2015, it was a part of the town Władysławowo.

For details of the history of the region, see History of Pomerania.
