= Osetnik, Pomeranian Voivodeship =

Osetnik
- Settlement
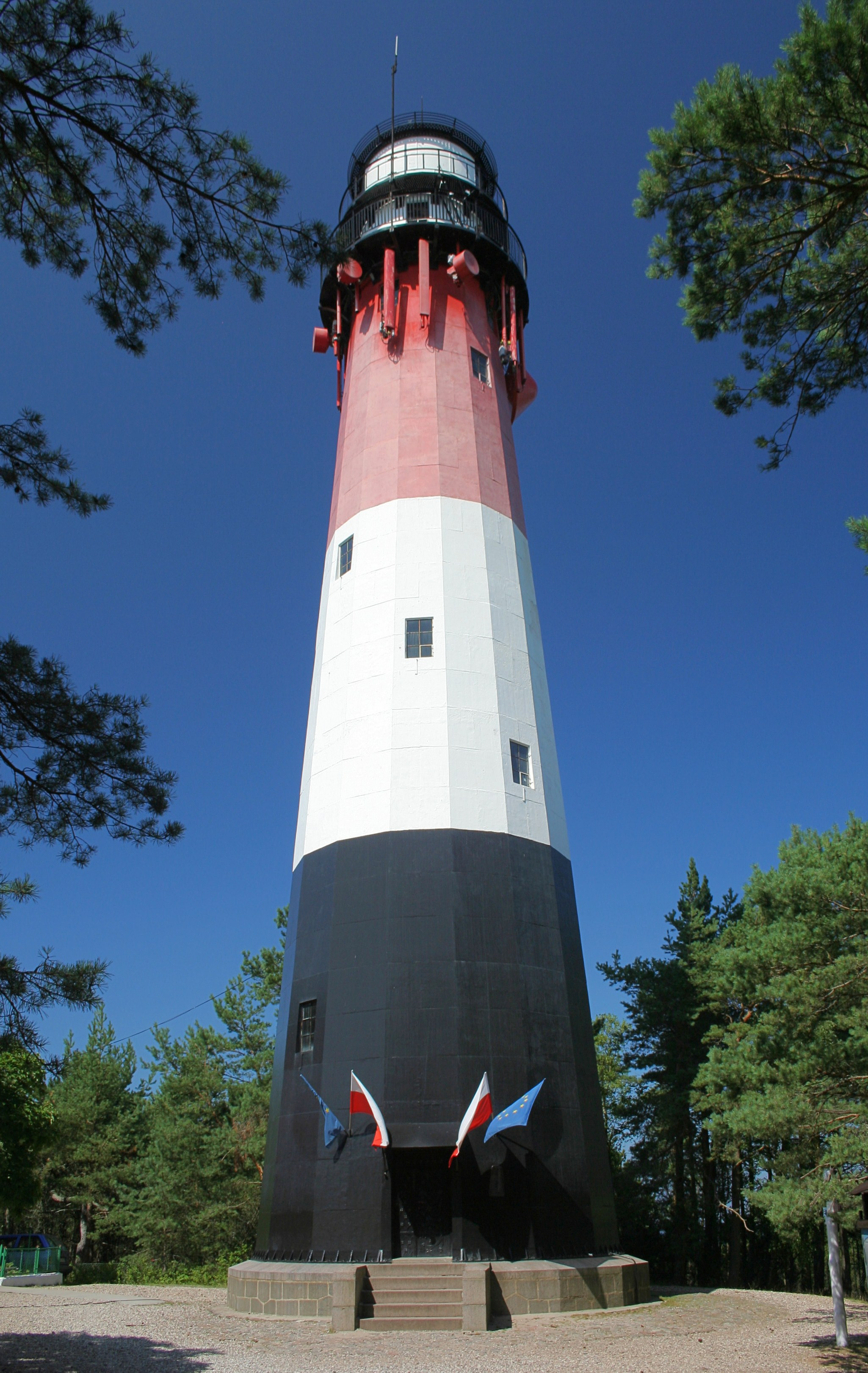
- Stilo Lighthouse

- Location within Poland
- Coordinates: 54°47′12″N 17°44′2″E
- Country: Poland
- Voivodeship: Pomeranian
- County: Wejherowo
- Gmina: Choczewo
- Time zone: UTC+1 (CET)
  - Summer (DST): UTC+2 (CEST)
- Vehicle registration: GWE

Osetnik [ɔˈsɛtnik] (Kashubian: Osétnëk) is a settlement in the administrative district of Gmina Choczewo, within Wejherowo County, Pomeranian Voivodeship, in northern Poland. It is located on the Slovincian Coast in the historic region of Pomerania.
