= ORP Ryś =

Two ships of the Polish Navy have been named ORP Ryś:

- ORP Ryś (1929), a Wilk-class submarine launched in 1929 and scrapped in 1956
- ORP Ryś (1959), a minesweeper launched in 1959 and decommissioned in 1989
