= ORP Łoś =

Polish minesweeper

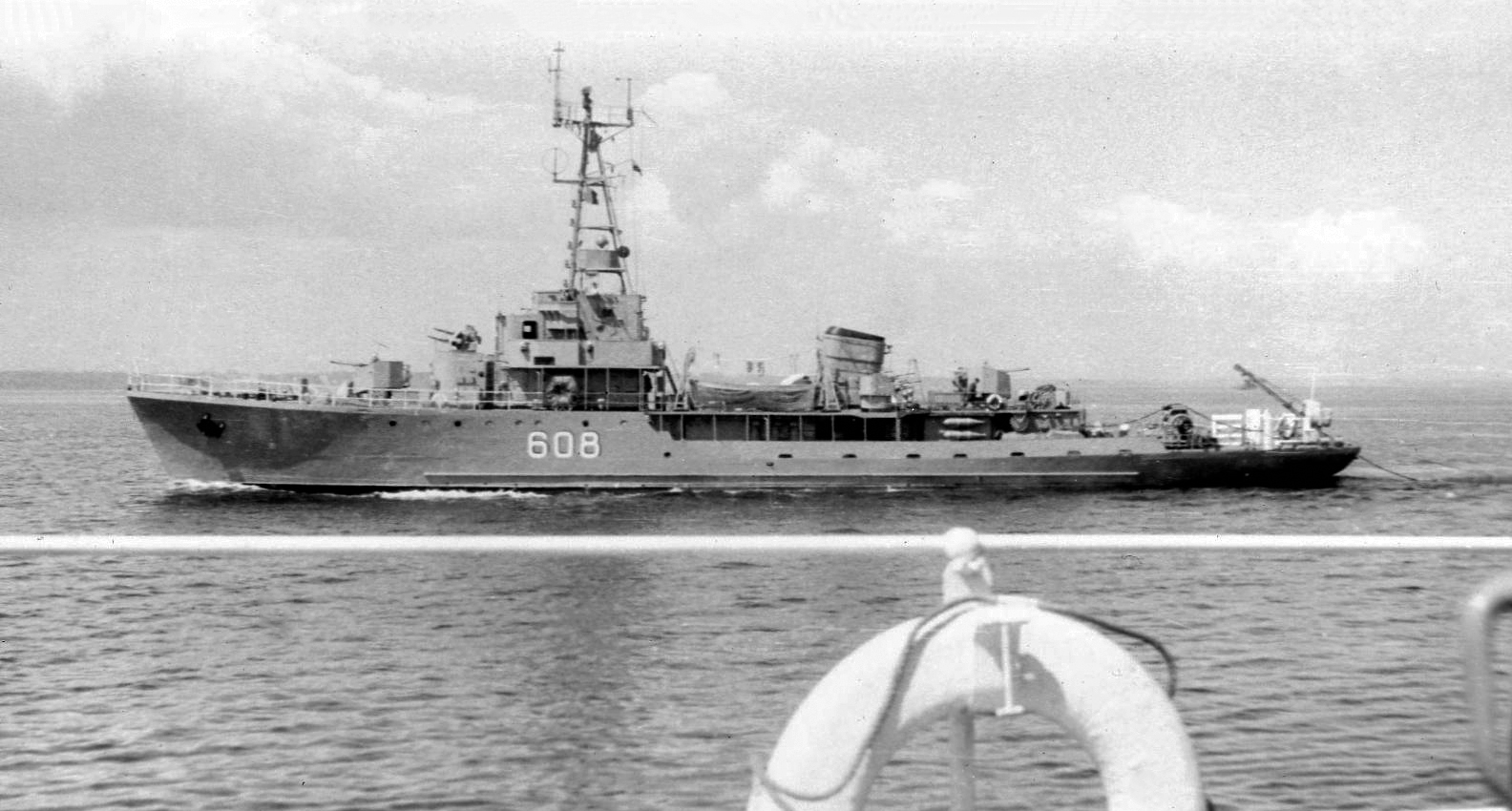
- Twin minesweeper ORP Delfin

History

Poland
- Name: ORP Łoś
- Builder: Stocznia Gdynia, Gdynia
- Laid down: 4 February 1957
- Launched: 29 June 1957
- Commissioned: 17 November 1957
- Decommissioned: 16 October 1989
- Fate: scrapped

General characteristics
- Class & type: minesweeper
- Type: T43-class minesweeper
- Displacement: standard: 500 t (490 long tons); full: 597 t (588 long tons)
- Length: 58 m (190 ft 3 in)
- Beam: 8.5 m (27 ft 11 in)
- Draft: 2.3 m (7 ft 7 in)
- Propulsion: 2 × 9D diesel engines, total power of 2,200 hp; 2 propellers
- Speed: 14 kn (26 km/h; 16 mph)
- Range: 3,200 nautical miles at a speed of 10 kn (19 km/h; 12 mph)
- Crew: 77
- Sensors & processing systems: Tamir-11 sonar; Lin-M radar; Kremnij-2 identification friend or foe system; ARP-50-1.2M radio direction finder
- Armament: 4 × 37 mm autocannons (2 twin mounts); 8 × 12.7 mm heavy machine guns (4 twin mounts); 2 depth charge racks, 10–16 naval mines

ORP Łoś was a Polish minesweeper from the Cold War era, one of three vessels built under a Soviet license as part of the Project 254K series. Launched on 29 June 1957 at the Stocznia Gdynia, the ship entered service with the Polish Navy on 17 November 1957. Bearing hull designations T-63 and later 603, this heavily used vessel spent most of its career with the 12th Base Minesweeper Squadron of the 8th Coastal Defence Flotilla in Świnoujście. After over 30 years of service, it was decommissioned in October 1989 and subsequently scrapped.

== Design and construction ==
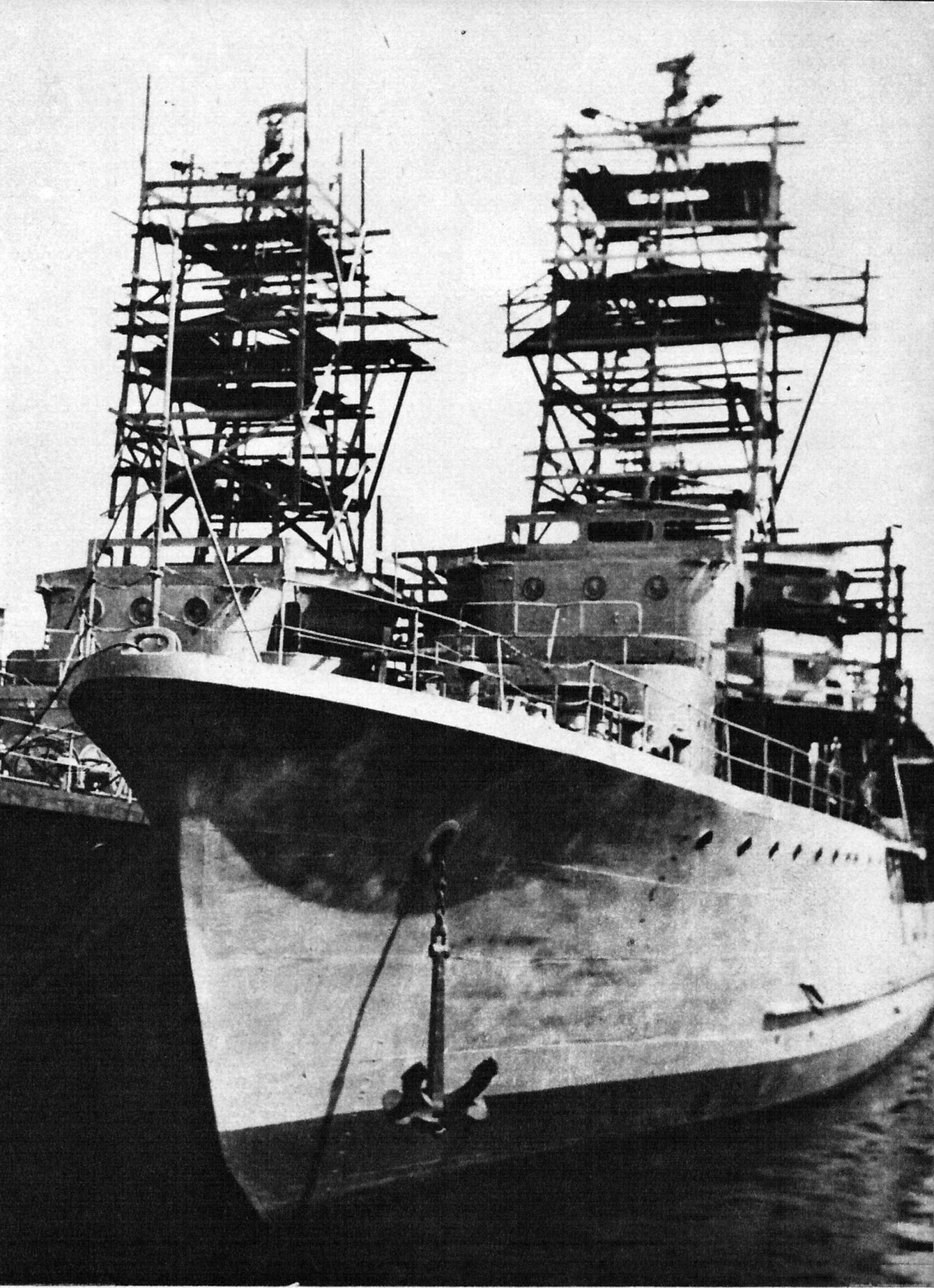
Final stages of construction of Polish T43-class minesweepers

Development of a seagoing base minesweeper began in the Soviet Union in 1943, drawing on experience from constructing and operating Project 58 and Project 263 minesweepers. Initial design work was handled by the CKB-370 design bureau, followed by CKB-17, with the final concept completed by CKB-363 in 1946. The new ships were designed to identify minefield boundaries, clear them, conduct control and reconnaissance sweeps, create passages through minefields, escort vessels behind sweeps, and lay mines. An additional requirement was the ability to detect and destroy submarines. Serial production started in 1947, yielding approximately 180 vessels across variants 254, 254K, 254M, and 254A.

In the early 1950s, Poland's State Economic Planning Commission and Polish General Staff decided to initiate licensed construction of these ships in Polish shipyards, including minesweepers. Technical documentation for Project 254K arrived in Poland in January 1953. Designated "500-ton Minesweeper", "Project 4", and "B 4", the design was approved for serial production on 8 February 1954 by a special commission of the Polish Navy Command. Although construction of a prototype was initially planned for 1953, delays arose as Gdańsk's Central Ship Design Bureau No. 2 struggled to adapt the Soviet documentation to Polish standards, pushing the start to mid-1955. Further delays occurred in September 1955 when an order was issued to build the newer 254M variant, but since construction had already begun – and equipment had been purchased from the Soviet Union – the first three ships (ORP Żubr, ORP Tur, and ORP Łoś) were completed in the original 254K configuration.

ORP Łoś was constructed at the Stocznia Gdynia. Its keel was laid on 4 February 1957, it was launched on 29 June 1957, and it was commissioned into the Polish Navy on 17 November 1957. The ship's name, derived from the land animal moose (łoś in Polish), broke with the navy's tradition of naming minesweepers after birds or sea creatures.

== Technical specifications ==
ORP Łoś was a large, oceangoing minesweeper. Its length overall was 58 metres (54 metres at the waterline), with a beam of 8.5 metres and a draft of 2.3 metres. Constructed entirely of steel with a fully welded hull, the ship was divided into 11 watertight compartments, listed from the bow: I – forepeak and storage, II – chain locker and food stores, III – living and service quarters plus storage, IV – tanks and crew quarters, V – ammunition magazine, VI – auxiliary machinery, VII – engine room, VIII – storage and ammunition magazine, IX – propeller shafts and crew quarters, X – minesweeping gear storage, and XI – steering gear room and chemical/uniform stores. A double hull running nearly the full length of the hull housed fuel tanks, water tanks, and bilges. Beneath the raised forecastle were a paint store, anchor gear, officers' mess, officers' cabins, and petty officers' quarters. Further aft, the superstructure contained radio equipment rooms, a galley, chimney ducts, an auxiliary generator, and the cable drum for the electromagnetic sweep.

The two-and-a-half-level forward superstructure included the commander's quarters, cipher room, radio cabins, radar operator room, bridge, navigation cabin with a sonar station, and, atop, a covered command post with a tall tripod mast supporting radar antennas and a searchlight. Standard displacement was 500 tons, with a full load of 597 tons. Propulsion came from two reversible, turbocharged, four-stroke diesel engines (9D model), delivering a combined 2,200 horsepower (hp) to two fixed-pitch propellers. Maximum speed was 14 knots (8.3 knots while sweeping). Range was 2,200 nautical miles at 14 knots, 3,200 nautical miles at 10 knots, and 1,500 nautical miles with sweeps at 7 knots. Endurance was 7 days.

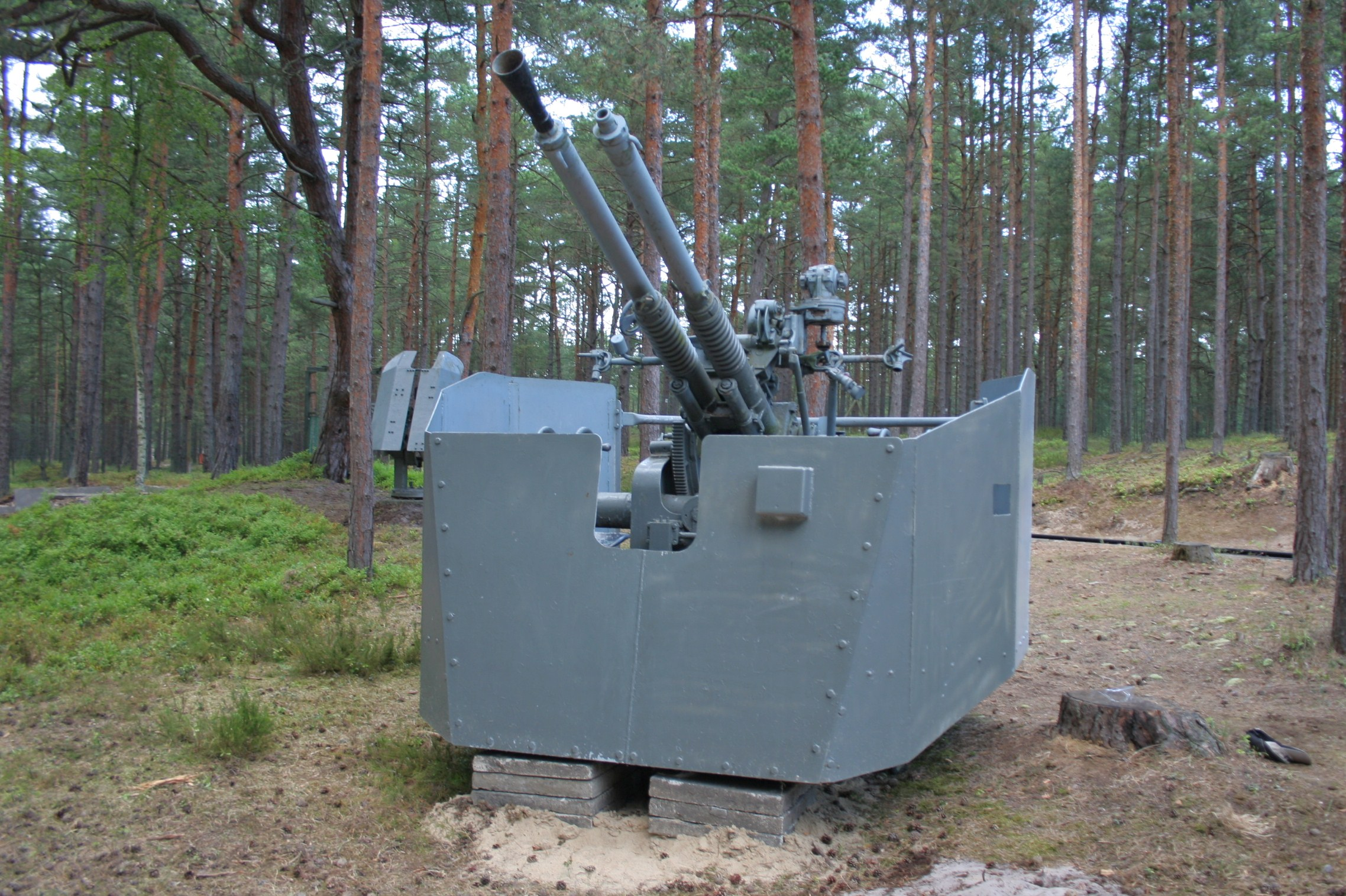
W-11M 37 mm artillery mount

The ship's artillery armament consisted of two twin W-11M 37 mm L/70 anti-aircraft guns, mounted on the forecastle and boat deck, with 1,000 rounds per barrel. Their practical range was 7,000 metres horizontally, with an effective anti-aircraft ceiling of about 4,000 metres. Four twin DShK 2M-1 12.7 mm L/79 heavy machine guns were also fitted – two on the forward superstructure and two on the boat deck flanking the funnel – with 2,000 rounds per barrel. Anti-submarine warfare armament included two BMB-1 depth charge throwers with a stock of 10 B-1 depth charges. The ship had two mine rails, capable of carrying 10 KB-3 naval mines or 16 wz. 08/39 mines. Minesweeping gear included two MT-1 or MT-2 contact sweeps, one TEM-52 electromagnetic sweep, and two BAT-2 acoustic sweeps.

Electronic equipment comprised the Kremnij-2 IFF system (with Fakieł-MZ transmitter and Fakieł-MO receiver), an UHF R-609 radio, a HF R-644 transmitter, an HF R-671 receiver, a full-range R-675 receiver, an ARP-50-1,2M radio direction finder, a Tamir-11 sonar, and a Lin-M general surveillance radar. Additional gear included launchers for eight MDSz smoke candles, an 800 kilogram-force cable winch, two 3-ton minesweeping davits, a 10-oar lifeboat, and life rafts. The crew numbered 77 officers, petty officers, and sailors.

== Service history ==
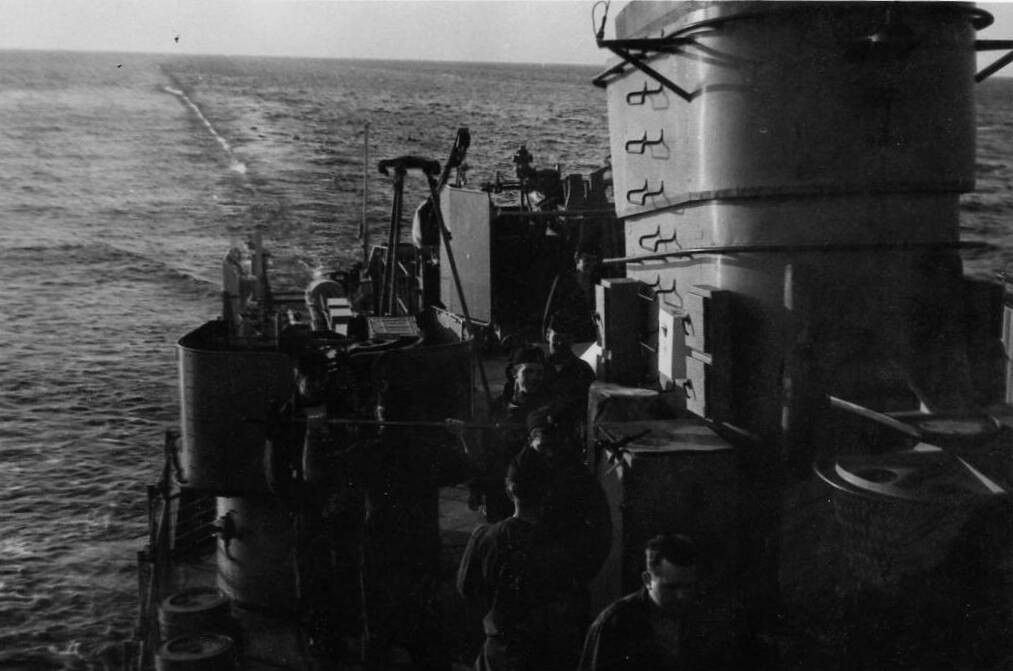
A Polish Project 254 minesweeper during sweeping operations

ORP Łoś was first commanded by Lieutenant Bronisław Podliszewski in November 1957. Initially bearing the hull number T-63, it served in the Minesweeper Squadron of the Main Base Water Area Defence Brigade, stationed at Hel. In 1959, the ship made its public debut to Polish audiences during Sea Holiday in Szczecin and, a month later, escorted a state delegation hosting General Secretary Nikita Khrushchev of the Communist Party of the Soviet Union in the same city. That year, it swept the roadstead off Kołobrzeg. On 4 January 1960, its hull number changed to 603. In 1960, it searched for mines near the port of Oksywie.

In April 1964, ORP Łoś, alongside sister ships ORP Żubr and ORP Tur, was transferred to Świnoujście and incorporated into the newly formed Base Minesweeper Group, established by Navy Command Order No. 055/Org. on 20 August 1964. Following a fleet reorganization in June 1965, it was assigned to the 12th Base Minesweeper Squadron of the 8th Coastal Defence Flotilla, remaining based in Świnoujście. In December 1965, it participated in a rescue operation for the submarine ORP Sęp, which suffered an explosion and fire in its battery compartment; after the fire was extinguished, the submarine was towed to Świnoujście. Beyond sweeping duties, the ship conducted patrols, including in the Danish Straits, and joint exercises with the 2nd Landing Ship Brigade.

From April to June 1967, ORP Łoś and ORP Żubr, alongside minesweeping trawlers, swept the Bay of Pomerania, operating from Rügen. In 1969, it joined its Świnoujście-based sister ships in the Warsaw Pact exercise Odra – Nysa 69, and on 28 June 1970, it took part in a naval parade marking the 25th anniversary of the Polish People's Republic Navy. In late August 1970, it searched for British non-contact mines in international waters of the Bay of Mecklenburg. In summer 1972, it inspected the northern waterway to Świnoujście used by passenger ferries. In subsequent years, it frequently participated in landing support exercises, training cruises with cadets from the Polish Naval Academy, and lengthy patrol missions. In June 1975, it joined the Poseidon-75 exercise. The ship made two foreign port visits: Copenhagen in April 1959 and Peenemünde from February to March 1984. Between 4 and 26 May 1983, it participated in the large-scale Reda-83 naval exercise.

During its long service, the ship's electronic equipment was upgraded. In the 1970s, the Lin-M radar was replaced with the TRN-823, the R-609 radio with the R-619, and the ARP-50-1,2M direction finder with receivers for the British Decca radionavigation system. In the 1980s, the Bras radionavigation system (with a Hałs receiver) was installed. ORP Łoś was decommissioned on 16 October 1989 after over 30 years of service, with its ensign lowered for the last time on 14 October. After removal of usable armament and equipment in Świnoujście's port, the ship was scrapped.

== Bibliography ==
- Rochowicz, Robert (2016). "Uniwersalne oracze morza. Trałowce bazowe projektu 254" [Universal Sea Plows: Project 254 Base Minesweepers]. Morza i Okręty (in Polish) (2): 7. ISSN 2450-2499.
