= Fugas-class minesweeper =

Class of Soviet era warship

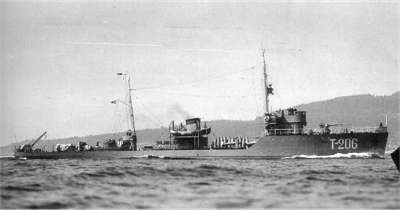
- Project 53-U minesweeper T-206 Verp

Class overview
- Name: Fugas class (Project 3)
- Operators: Soviet Navy; Korean People's Navy
- Succeeded by: T43-class minesweeper
- Built: 1933–1946
- In commission: 1936–1961
- Completed: 44
- Active: 1
- Lost: 19
- Retired: 24

General characteristics
- Displacement: 490–535 tonnes (482–527 long tons; 540–590 short tons)
- Length: 62 metres (203 ft 5 in)
- Beam: 7.41 metres (24 ft 4 in)
- Draft: 2.5 metres (8 ft 2 in)
- Installed power: 2 × 1,400 metric horsepower (1,380 hp)
- Propulsion: 2 × diesel engines; two shafts
- Speed: 17.5 knots (32 km/h; 20 mph)
- Range: 7,200 nmi (13,300 km; 8,300 mi) at 12 kn (22 km/h; 14 mph)
- Complement: 52–61
- Armament: Main armament: 1 × 100 mm (3.9 in) B-24 M1936 naval cannon; Dual-purpose weapon: 1 × 45 mm 21-K or 1–3 × 37 mm 70-K or 2 × 25 mm 84-KM AA guns; 2 × Oerlikon 20 mm guns (1942 upgrade in the Baltic Fleet); 2 × 12.7 mm DK machine guns; 2–4 × 12.7 mm DShK machine guns (1942 upgrade in the Baltic and Pacific Fleets); 2 × 12.7 mm M2 Browning machine guns (1942 upgrade in the Pacific Fleet); Anti-submarine weapon: 2 × BMB-1 M1940 anti-submarine mortars; 2 × depth charge racks; 40 × depth charges; Mine warfare equipment: 21–31 × M1926 moored mines

The Fugas class (Russian: фугас, lit. 'fougasse') was a series of minesweepers built for the Soviet Navy in the 1930s and 1940s. The Soviet designations were Project 3, Project 53, Project 53-U and Project 58.

== Design ==
The design specification was issued in 1930 and the design was approved in 1931. The project numbers (3, 53, 53-U or 58) were retroactively applied in 1939.

The ships were built with steel hulls using a mixed welding and riveted construction. Crew section was additionally coated by wood laminate for the thermal isolation. The vessel interior was split into nine water-proof compartments. Vessels were intended to be very habitable in long voyages, with central heating, sauna and even cinema apparatus.

Mine-sweeping equipment consisted of three towed trails. Various attempts to fit the leading trails were not successful. Also, the magnetic trails were fitted starting from 1944, followed soon by acoustic trails. Survivability against magnetic-sensing mines was provided by 3-section degaussing coils.

Wartime operation have resulted in several field modifications, of which typical the increase of anti-aircraft armaments, usually at the expense of the amount of carried mines and artillery shells – due to the limited stability of the vessel. The turnover maximal recovering force angle was just 38 degrees with standard load.

The crew was also provided with small arms (one Degtyaryov machine gun and 15 rifles) for the onshore fire support. Finally, the minesweepers were capable to carry up to ten 45 mm anti-tank guns and up to 600 infantry with light armament.

The design was considered generally satisfactory, the design flaws resulting in reduced seaworthiness, survivability and insufficient stability being gradually rectified in later sub-types. The intrinsic problems of relatively poor maneuverability and draft too deep for the minesweeper (resulting in frequent vessel destruction in minefields) were impossible to fix though.

Several versions were produced:

- Project 3 (1930) – 8 vessels, crew complement 52 men
- Project 53 (1933) – 10 vessels, rigid ballast, improvement of steering gear, doors and hatches
- Project 53-U (1937) – 17 vessels, widened hull, increased AA guns, crew complement 66 men
- Project 58 (1937) – 7 vessels, improved compartmentalization and stability, better diesel engines rated to 1,600 metric horsepower (1,580 hp) each

== Ships ==
A total of 44 ships were built, although 2 latest ships were never completed to minesweeper specifications. The vessels with a single-digit designations (T-1 to T-8) were assigned to the Pacific Fleet, T-201 to T-221 – to the Baltic Fleet, and T-401 to T-415 – to the Black Sea Fleet.

Name	Sub-class	?Launched	Commissioned	Fate	Comments
T-1 Strela	Project 53	10/5/1935	13/8/1938	retired	
T-2 Tros	Project 53	22/5/1935	25/9/1938	retired	transferred to North Korea
T-3 Podsekatel	Project 53	16/9/1935	14/11/1938	retired	
T-4 Provodnik	Project 53	30/6/1935	4/12/1938	retired	
T-5 Paravan	Project 58	15/3/1937	30/12/1938	retired	
T-6 Kapsyul	Project 58	21/3/1937	30/1/1939	retired	
T-7 Vekha	Project 53	30/12/1936	8/9/1938	sunk	sunk in storm in 1949
T-8 Cheka	Project 53	27/12/1936	2/11/1938	active	transferred to North Korea in December 1953
T-201 Zaryad	Project 3	12/10/1933	26/12/1936	sunk	the Iosif Stalin-class transport VT-509 was damaged by same mine which sank Zaryad
T-202 Buy	Project 3	12/12/1933	11/8/1938	sunk	sunk by a German E-boat
T-203 Patron	Project 3	28/12/1933	4/7/1938	sunk	
T-204 Fugas	Project 3	5/1/1934	10/12/1936	sunk	a mine laid by Fugas sunk the German submarine chaser Uj-113 Nordmark
T-205 Gafel	Project 53-U	11/10/1937	21/7/1939	retired	severely damaged during a gauntlet in the Gulf of Finland
T-206 Verp	Project 53-U	12/10/1937	17/6/1939	sunk	
T-207 Shpil	Project 53-U	17/11/1937	23/9/1939	retired	
T-208 Shkiv	Project 53-U	18/11/1937	12/10/1939	sunk	sunk by the German E-boats S-35 and S-60
T-209 Knekht	Project 53-U	16/6/1938	3/6/1940	sunk	
T-210 Gak	Project 53-U	8/8/1938	14/11/1939	retired	sunk and raised in 1944
T-211 Rym	Project 53-U	21/9/1938	25/6/1940	retired	
T-212 Shtag	Project 53-U	6/6/1938	26/7/1940	sunk	
T-213 Krambol	Project 53-U	26/8/1938	30/11/1939	sunk	
T-214 Bugel	Project 53-U	26/8/1938	29/6/1940	sunk	sunk 28 August 1941 by mines together with 34 other vessels in a gauntlet in the Gulf of Finland
T-215	Project 53-U	23/4/1939	30/9/1940	retired	refitted as the barracks ship PKZ-33 in 1961
T-216	Project 53-U	17/9/1939	24/12/1940	sunk	sunk 28 August 1941 by mines together with 34 other vessels in a gauntlet in the Gulf of Finland
T-217 Kontr-admiral Yurkovskiy	Project 53-U	21/9/1939	5/8/1941	retired	scrapped in 1961
T-218	Project 53-U	20/3/1939	23/12/1940	retired	refitted as the experimental vessel OS-9 in 1957
T-219 Kontr-admiral Khoroshkhin	Project 53-U	27/4/1941	25/9/1944	retired	refitted as an experimental vessel in 1956
T-220	Project 53-U	10/4/1941	16/10/1946	retired	
T-221	Project 53-U	10/4/1941	6/6/1946	retired	renamed Dmitry Lysov upon completion
T-401 Tral	Project 3	5/11/1933	23/12/1936	sunk	sunk as a target ship in 1955
T-402 Minrep	Project 3	5/11/1933	28/1/1937	sunk	
T-403 Gruz	Project 3	20/3/1934	25/7/1937	sunk	
T-404 Shchit	Project 3	17/1/1934	25/7/1937	retired	mines of Shchit and Yakor have sunk 1 German minelayer and 2 minesweepers
T-405 Vzryvatel	Project 53	11/8/1936	27/4/1938	sunk	heavily damaged by artillery and sank in storm
T-406 Iskatel	Project 53	19/9/1936	29/4/1938	retired	refitted as an experimental vessel in 1954 and survived until 1990
T-407 Mina	Project 53	22/12/1936	19/8/1938	retired	refitted as a training ship in 1956, scrapped in 1992
T-408 Yakor	Project 58	28/3/1937	15/2/1939	retired	mines of Shchit and Yakor have sunk 1 German minelayer and 2 minesweepers
T-409 Garpun	Project 58	27/4/1937	20/2/1939	retired	scrapped in 1960
T-410 Vzryv	Project 58	29/4/1937	9/3/1939	sunk	sinking of Vzryv by German U-19 was a pretext for the Soviets seizing the Royal Romanian Navy in September 1944
T-411 Zashchitnik	Project 53	10/8/1936	31/7/1938	sunk	
T-412 Arseny Raskin	Project 58	13/4/1939	3/3/1941	retired	scrapped in 1957
T-413	Project 58	29/4/1939	21/4/1941	sunk	raised and scrapped in 1947
T-414	unique	3/1/1941	17/9/1945	retired	was assigned to fleet rebuild/repair query but was never complete
T-415	unique	20/3/1941	5/11/1947	retired	built as the training ship UTS-255 after attempted demolition in 1942

== See also ==
- List of ships of the Soviet Navy
- List of ships of Russia by project number
