= Shaft (mechanical engineering) =

Rotating machine element

In mechanical engineering, a shaft is a rotating machine element, usually circular in cross section, which is used to transmit power from one part to another, or from a machine which produces power to a machine which absorbs power.

== Types ==
They are mainly classified into two types.

- Transmission shafts are used to transmit power between the source and the machine absorbing power; e.g. counter shafts and line shafts.
- Machine shafts are the integral part of the machine itself; e.g. crankshaft.
- Axle shaft.
- Spindle shaft.

== Materials ==
The material used for ordinary shafts is mild steel. When high strength is required, an alloy steel such as nickel, nickel-chromium or chromium-vanadium steel is used. Shafts are generally formed by hot rolling and finished to size by cold drawing or turning and grinding.

== Standard sizes ==
=== Machine shafts ===
- Up to 25 mm steps of 0.5 mm

=== Transmission shafts ===
- 25 mm to 60 mm with 5 mm steps
- 60 mm to 110 mm with 10 mm steps
- 110 mm to 140 mm with 15 mm steps
- 140 mm to 500 mm with 20 mm steps

The standard lengths of the shafts are 5 m, 6 m and 7 m.

Usually 1m to 5m is used.

== Stresses ==
The following stresses are induced in the shafts.

1. Shear stresses due to the transmission of torque (due to torsional load).
2. Bending stresses (tensile or compressive) due to the forces acting upon the machine elements like gears and pulleys as well as the self weight of the shaft.
3. Stresses due to combined torsional and bending loads.
