= ORP Bóbr =

Polish minesweeper

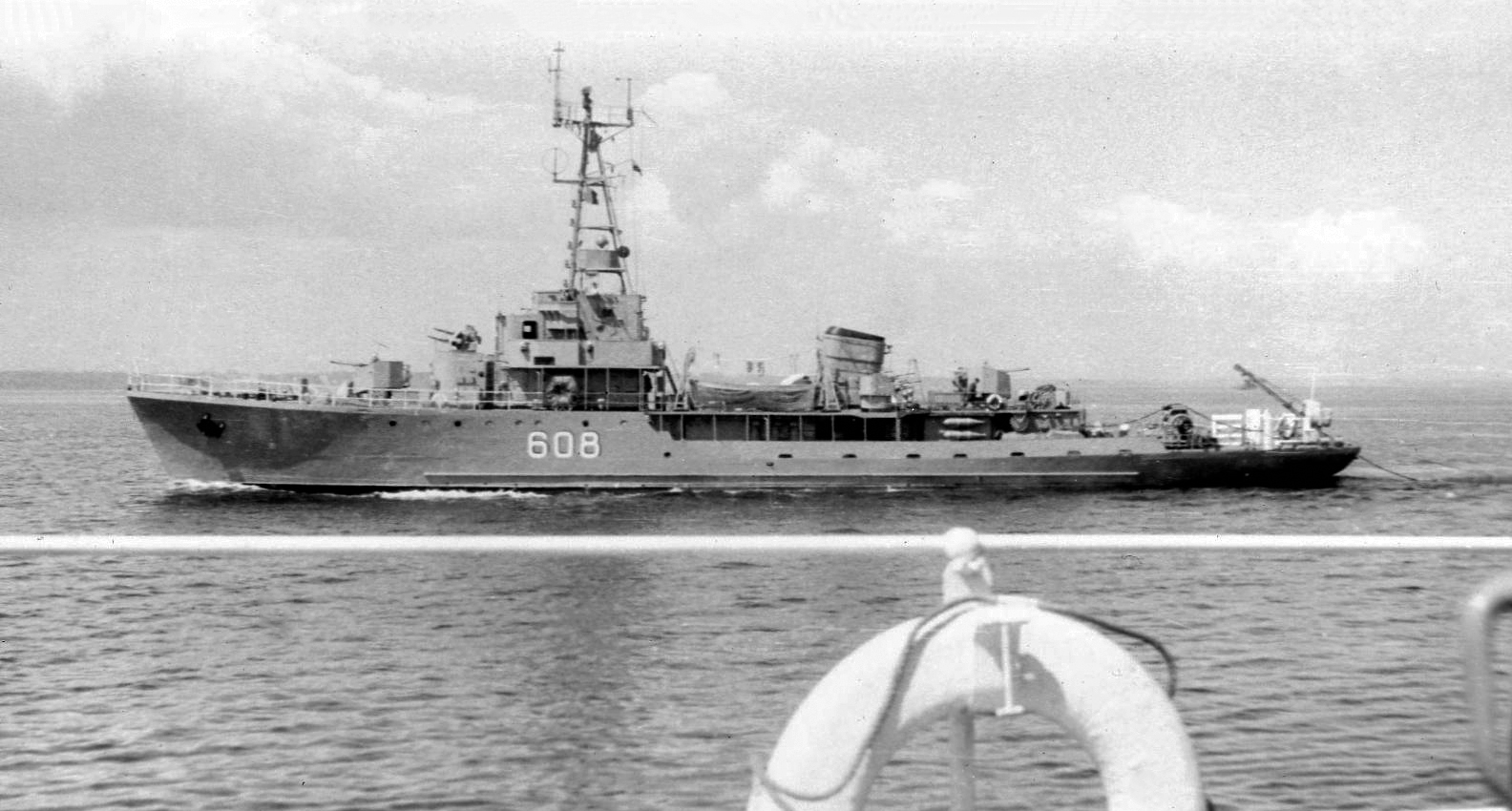
- Twin minesweeper ORP Delfin

History

Poland
- Name: ORP Bóbr
- Builder: Stocznia Gdynia, Gdynia
- Laid down: December 16, 1957
- Launched: March 22, 1958
- Commissioned: November 8, 1958
- Decommissioned: May 18, 1990
- Fate: scrapped

General characteristics
- Class & type: minesweeper
- Type: T43-class minesweeper
- Displacement: standard: 549 t (540 long tons); full: 606 t (596 long tons)
- Length: full: 59 m (193 ft 7 in); at the waterline: 54 m (177 ft 2 in)
- Beam: 8.7 m (28 ft 7 in)
- Draft: 2.3 m (7 ft 7 in)
- Propulsion: 2 × 9D diesel engines, total power of 2,200 hp; 2 propellers
- Speed: 15 kn (28 km/h; 17 mph)
- Range: 3,500 nautical miles at a speed of 10 kn (19 km/h; 12 mph)
- Crew: 80
- Sensors & processing systems: Tamir-11 sonar; Lin-M radar; Kremnij-2 identification friend or foe system; ARP-50-1.2M radio direction finder
- Armament: 4 × 37 mm guns (2 twin mounts); 4 × 25 mm guns (2 twin mounts); 4 × 14.5 mm heavy machine guns (2 twin mounts); 2 depth charge racks, 10–16 naval mines

ORP Bóbr was a Polish minesweeper from the Cold War era, one of nine vessels built under a Soviet license as part of the Project 254M series. Launched on 22 March 1958 at the Stocznia Gdynia, the ship entered service with the Polish Navy on 8 November of the same year. Bearing hull designations T-66 and later 606, this heavily utilized vessel spent most of its career with the 12th Base Minesweeper Squadron of the 8th Coastal Defence Flotilla in Świnoujście. After over 30 years of service, it was decommissioned in May 1990 and subsequently scrapped.

== Design and construction ==
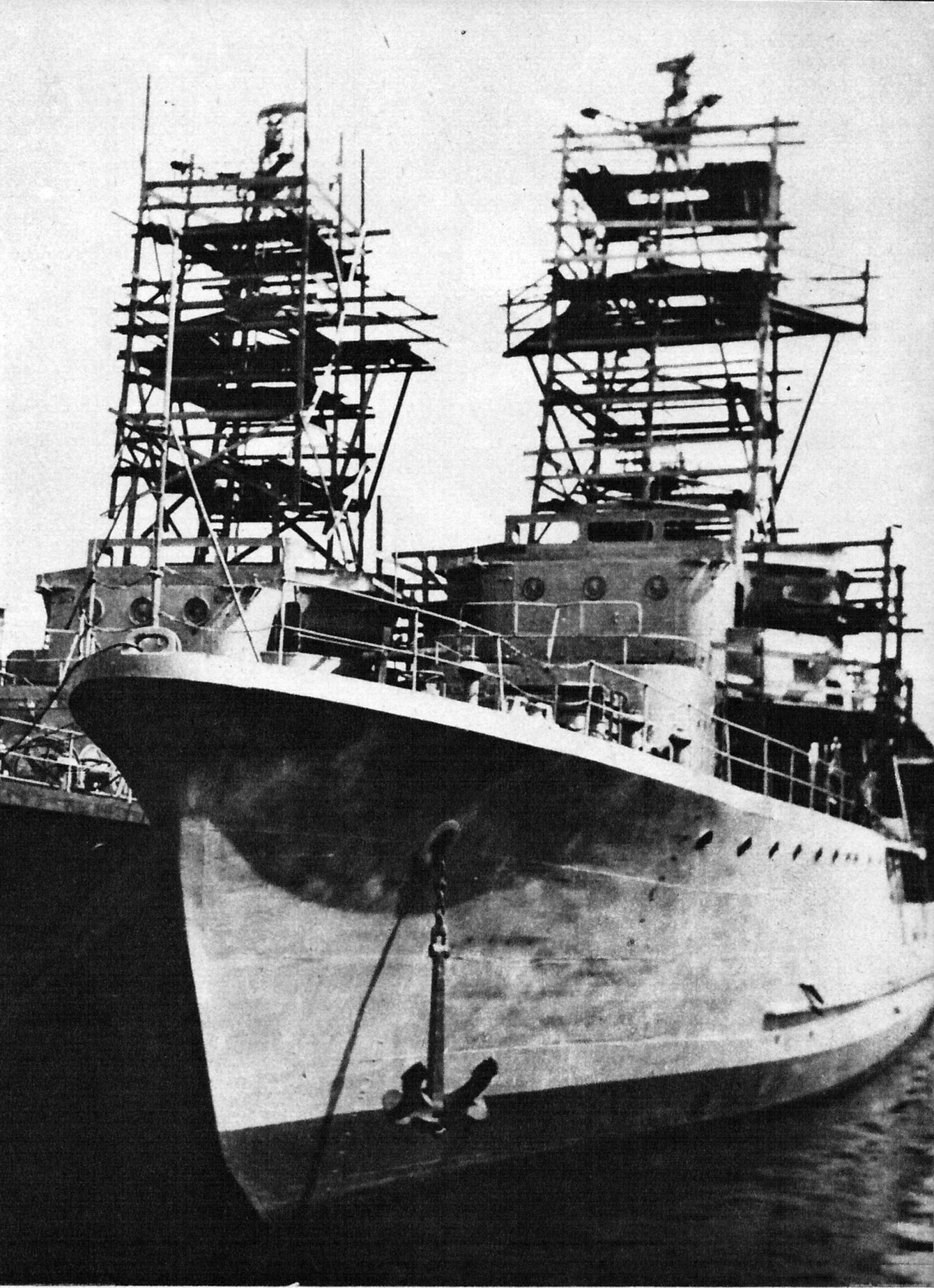
Final stages of construction of Polish T43-class minesweepers

Development of a seagoing base minesweeper began in the Soviet Union in 1943, drawing on experience from constructing and operating Project 58 and Project 263 minesweepers. Initial design work was handled by the CKB-370 design bureau, followed by CKB-17, with the final concept completed by CKB-363 in 1946. The new ships were designed to identify minefield boundaries, clear them, conduct control and reconnaissance sweeps, create passages through minefields, escort vessels behind sweeps, and lay mines. An additional requirement was the ability to detect and destroy submarines. Serial production started in 1947, yielding approximately 180 vessels across variants 254, 254K, 254M, and 254A.

In the early 1950s, Poland's State Economic Planning Commission and Polish General Staff decided to initiate licensed construction of these ships in Polish shipyards, including minesweepers. Technical documentation for Project 254K arrived in Poland in January 1953. Designated "500-ton Minesweeper", "Project 4", and "B 4", the design was approved for serial production on 8 February 1954 by a special commission of the Polish Navy Command. Although construction of a prototype was initially planned for 1953, delays arose as Gdańsk's Central Ship Design Bureau No. 2 struggled to adapt the Soviet documentation to Polish standards, pushing the start to mid-1955. Further delays occurred in September 1955 when an order was issued to build the newer 254M variant, but since construction had already begun – and equipment had been purchased from the Soviet Union – it was decided that the first three vessels (which later became ORP Żubr, ORP Tur, and ORP Łoś) would be completed in the original configuration.

The technical documentation for the M version arrived in Poland in March 1956, but continued revisions led to additional delays in the construction program. The main differences compared to the K version included enhanced armament (replacing four twin 2M-1 12.7 mm heavy machine gun mounts with two twin 2M-3M 25 mm automatic cannon mounts and two twin 2M-7 14.5 mm heavy machine gun mounts) and upgraded minesweeping equipment (MKT-1 contact sweeps, BGAT acoustic sweeps, and TEM-52M electromagnetic sweeps). The M-version ships also featured a redesigned stern, which extended the hull length by one metre. The original plan was to build a series of 27 vessels based on Project 254. However, changes in versions and the political thaw of October 1956 resulted in the series being limited to just 12 ships – three of Project 254K and nine of Project 254M.

ORP Bóbr was constructed at the Stocznia Gdynia. Its keel was laid on 16 December 1957, it was launched on 22 March 1958, and it was commissioned into the Polish Navy on 8 November that year. The minesweeper was named after the semi-aquatic animal – the Eurasian beaver (bóbr in Polish).

== Technical specifications ==
ORP Bóbr was a large, oceangoing minesweeper. Its length overall was 59 metres (54 metres at the waterline), with a beam of 8.7 metres and a draft of 2.3 metres. Constructed entirely of steel with a fully welded hull, the ship was divided into 11 watertight compartments, listed from the bow: I – forepeak and storage, II – chain locker and food stores, III – living and service quarters plus storage, IV – tanks and crew quarters, V – ammunition magazine, VI – auxiliary machinery, VII – engine room, VIII – storage and ammunition magazine, IX – propeller shafts and crew quarters, X – minesweeping gear storage, and XI – steering gear room and chemical/uniform stores. A double hull running nearly the full length of the hull housed fuel tanks, water tanks, and bilges. Beneath the raised forecastle were a paint store, anchor gear, officers' mess, officers' cabins, and petty officers' quarters. Further aft, the superstructure contained radio equipment rooms, a galley, chimney ducts, an auxiliary generator, and the cable drum for the electromagnetic sweep.

The two-and-a-half-level forward superstructure included the commander's quarters, cipher room, radio cabins, radar operator room, bridge, navigation cabin with a sonar station, and, atop, a covered command post with a tall tripod mast supporting radar antennas and a searchlight. Standard displacement was 549 tons, with a full load of 606 tons. Propulsion came from two reversible, turbocharged, four-stroke diesel engines (9D model) with a total output of 2,200 horsepower, driving two controllable-pitch WRSz propellers via drive shafts. Maximum speed was 15 knots (8.3 knots while sweeping). Range was 2,100 nautical miles at 15 knots and 3,500 nautical miles at 10 knots. Endurance was 7 days.

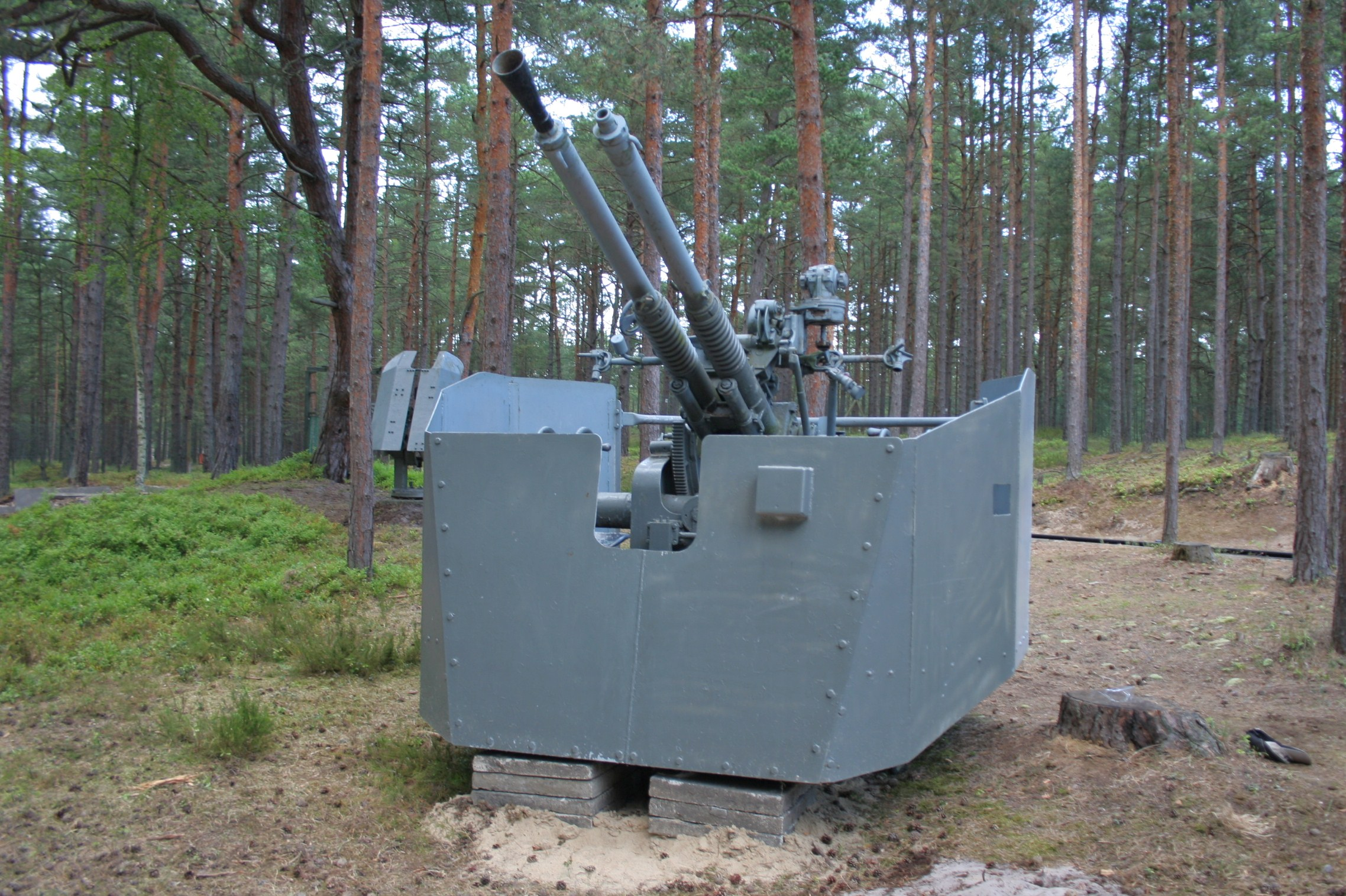
W-11M 37 mm artillery mount

The ship's artillery armament consisted of two twin W-11M 37 mm L/70 anti-aircraft guns, mounted on the forecastle and boat deck, with 1,000 rounds per barrel. Their practical range was 7,000 metres horizontally, with an effective anti-aircraft ceiling of about 4,000 metres. On the boat deck, on both sides of the funnel, were two twin 2M-3M 25 mm L/112 autocannons, with a total of 2,000 rounds of ammunition. Mounted on the forward superstructure were two twin 2M-7 heavy machine gun mounts with 14.5 mm L/89 barrels, each supplied with 2,000 rounds per barrel. Anti-submarine warfare armament included two BMB-2 depth charge throwers with a stock of 10 B-1 depth charges. The ship had two mine rails, capable of carrying 10 KB-3 naval mines or 16 wz. 08/39 mines. Minesweeping gear included two MT-1 contact sweeps with cutting shears, one TEM-52 electromagnetic sweep, and two BGAT acoustic sweeps.

Electronic equipment comprised the Kremnij-2 IFF system (with Fakieł-MZ transmitter and Fakieł-MO receiver), an UHF R-609 radio, a HF R-644 transmitter, an HF R-671 receiver, a full-range R-675 receiver, an ARP-50-1.2M radio direction finder, a Tamir-11 sonar, and a Lin-M general surveillance radar, and the Rym-K radionavigation system (comprising Receiver Station No. 4 and the Koordinator unit). Additional gear included launchers for eight MDSz smoke candles, an 800 kilogram-force cable winch, two 5.8-ton minesweeping davits, a 10-oar lifeboat, and life rafts. The crew numbered 80 officers, petty officers, and sailors.

== Service history ==
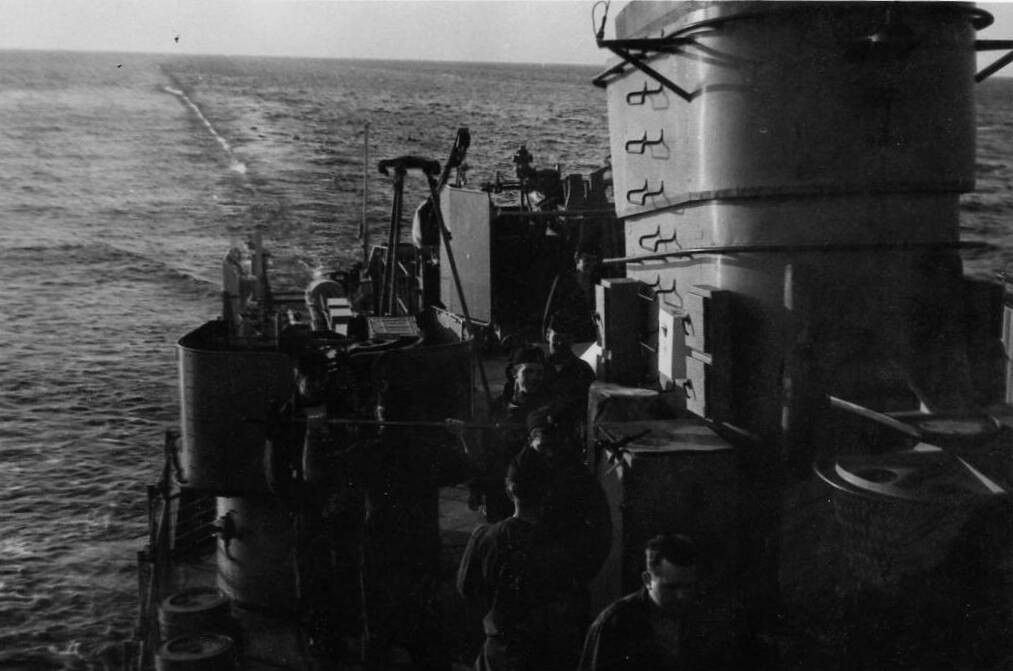
A Polish Project 254 minesweeper during sweeping operations

The vessel, initially bearing the hull number T-66, it served in the Minesweeper Squadron of the Main Base Water Area Defence Brigade, stationed at Hel. In 1959, the ship made its public debut to Polish audiences during Sea Holiday in Szczecin. That same year, it swept the roadstead off Kołobrzeg. On 4 January 1960, its hull number changed to 606. In the same year, it searched for mines near the port of Oksywie. In July 1964, it participated in sweeping the shipping route from Osetnik to Cape Rozewie, and in the autumn of the following year, it searched for mines in the waters of the Gdańsk Bay.

In the late 1960s, the vessel underwent a general overhaul at the Naval Shipyard in Gdynia. Upon completion, by order no. 010/Org. of the Commander of the Navy dated 24 June 1969, it was transferred – along with the twin minesweepers ORP Dzik and ORP Bizon – to Świnoujście and incorporated into the 12th Base Minesweeper Squadron of the 8th Coastal Defence Flotilla. That year, it joined its Świnoujście-based sister ships in the Warsaw Pact exercise Odra – Nysa 69, and on 28 June 1970, it took part in a naval parade marking the 25th anniversary of the Polish People's Republic Navy.

In addition to its minesweeping duties, the ship was used for patrol service, including in the Danish Straits region, and participated in joint exercises with units of the 2nd Landing Ship Brigade. In he second half o August 1970, it searched for British non-contact mines in international waters of the Bay of Mecklenburg. In summer 1972, it inspected the northern waterway to Świnoujście used by passenger ferries. In subsequent years, it frequently participated in landing support exercises, training cruises with cadets from the Polish Naval Academy, and lengthy patrol missions. The minesweeper’s routine service was occasionally broken by foreign visits: Portsmouth in September 1960, Riga between September and October 1964, London in May 1977, and again Riga and Liepāja in August 1988. In June 1975, the ship took part in an exercise codenamed Posejdon-75, and between 4 and 26 May 1983, it participated in the large-scale Reda-83 naval exercise.

During its long service, the ship's electronic equipment was upgraded. In the 1970s, the Lin-M radar was replaced with the TRN-823, the R-609 radio with the R-619, and the ARP-50-1.2M direction finder with receivers for the British Decca radionavigation system. In the 1980s, the Bras radionavigation system (with a Hałs receiver) was installed. ORP Bóbr was decommissioned on 18 May 1990 after over 30 years of service. After removal of usable armament and equipment in Świnoujście's port, the ship was scrapped.

== Bibliography ==
- Rochowicz, Robert (2016). "Uniwersalne oracze morza. Trałowce bazowe projektu 254" [Universal Sea Plows: Project 254 Base Minesweepers]. Morza i Okręty (in Polish) (2): 7. ISSN 2450-2499.
