= ORP Tur =

Polish minesweeper

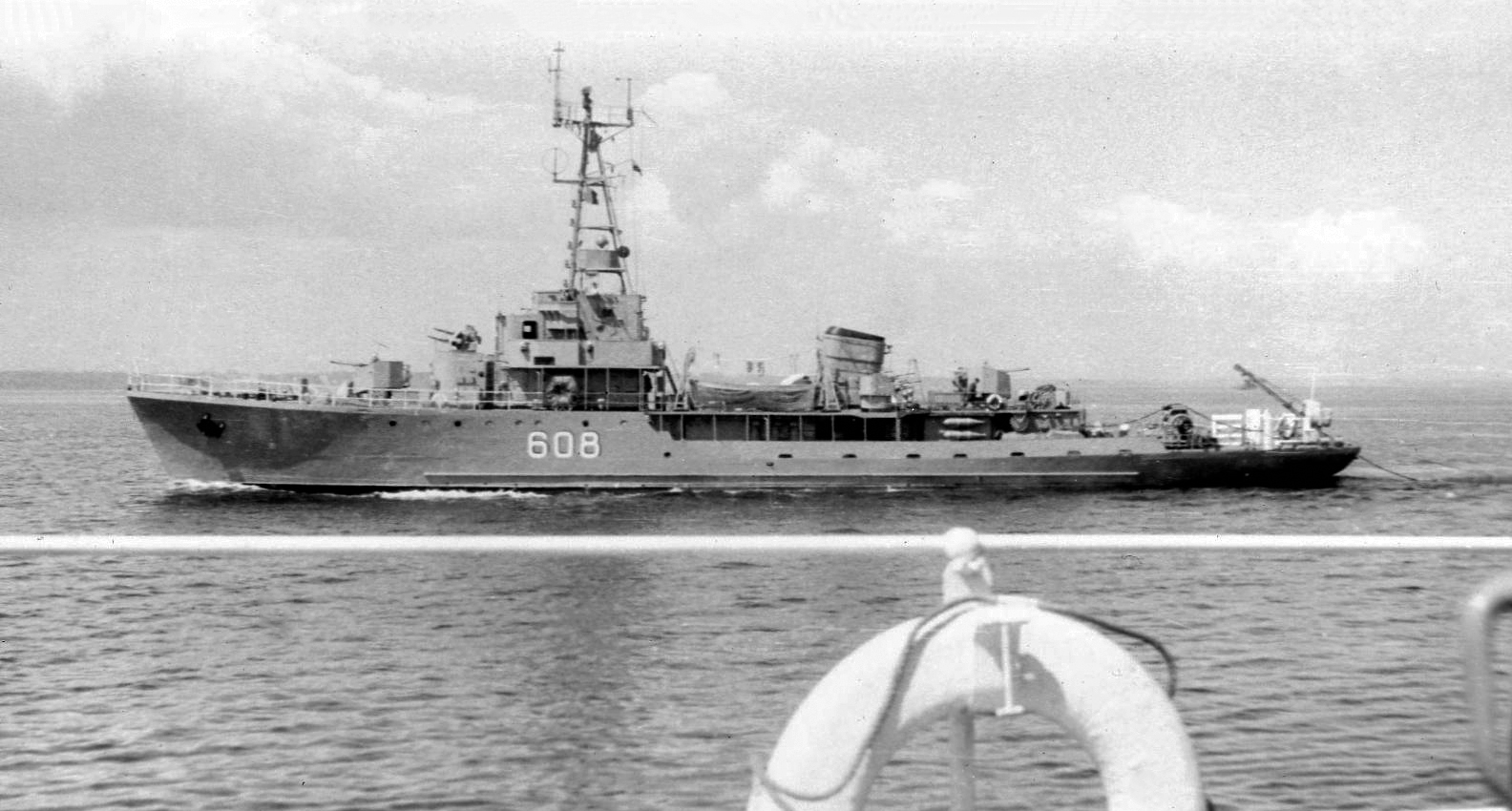
- Twin minesweeper ORP Delfin

History

Poland
- Name: ORP Tur
- Builder: Stocznia Gdynia, Gdynia
- Laid down: July 23, 1956
- Launched: December 22, 1956
- Commissioned: August 6, 1957
- Decommissioned: October 31, 1991
- Fate: sank on 14 January 1993, raised and scrapped

General characteristics
- Class & type: minesweeper
- Type: T43-class minesweeper
- Displacement: standard: 500 t (490 long tons); full: 597 t (588 long tons)
- Length: 58 m (190 ft 3 in)
- Beam: 8.5 m (27 ft 11 in)
- Draft: 2.3 m (7 ft 7 in)
- Propulsion: 2 × 9D diesel engines, total power of 2,200 hp; 2 propellers
- Speed: 14 kn (26 km/h; 16 mph)
- Range: 3,200 nautical miles at a speed of 10 kn (19 km/h; 12 mph)
- Crew: 77
- Sensors & processing systems: Tamir-11 sonar; Lin-M radar; Kremnij-2 identification friend or foe system; ARP-50-1.2M radio direction finder
- Armament: 4 × 37 mm autocannons (2 twin mounts); 8 × 12.7 mm heavy machine guns (4 twin mounts); 2 depth charge racks, 10–16 naval mines

ORP Tur was a Polish minesweeper from the Cold War era, one of three vessels built under a Soviet license as part of the Project 254K series. Launched on 22 December 1956 at the Stocznia Gdynia, the ship entered service with the Polish Navy on 6 August 1957. Bearing hull designations T-62 and later 602, this heavily utilized vessel spent most of its career with the 12th Base Minesweeper Squadron of the 8th Coastal Defence Flotilla in Świnoujście. In 1978, the minesweeper was converted into a research vessel and served in this role until October 1991, as the last Polish unit of Project 254. While awaiting scrapping, the ship sank during a storm in Gdynia on 14 January 1993, and was later raised and scrapped.

== Design and construction ==
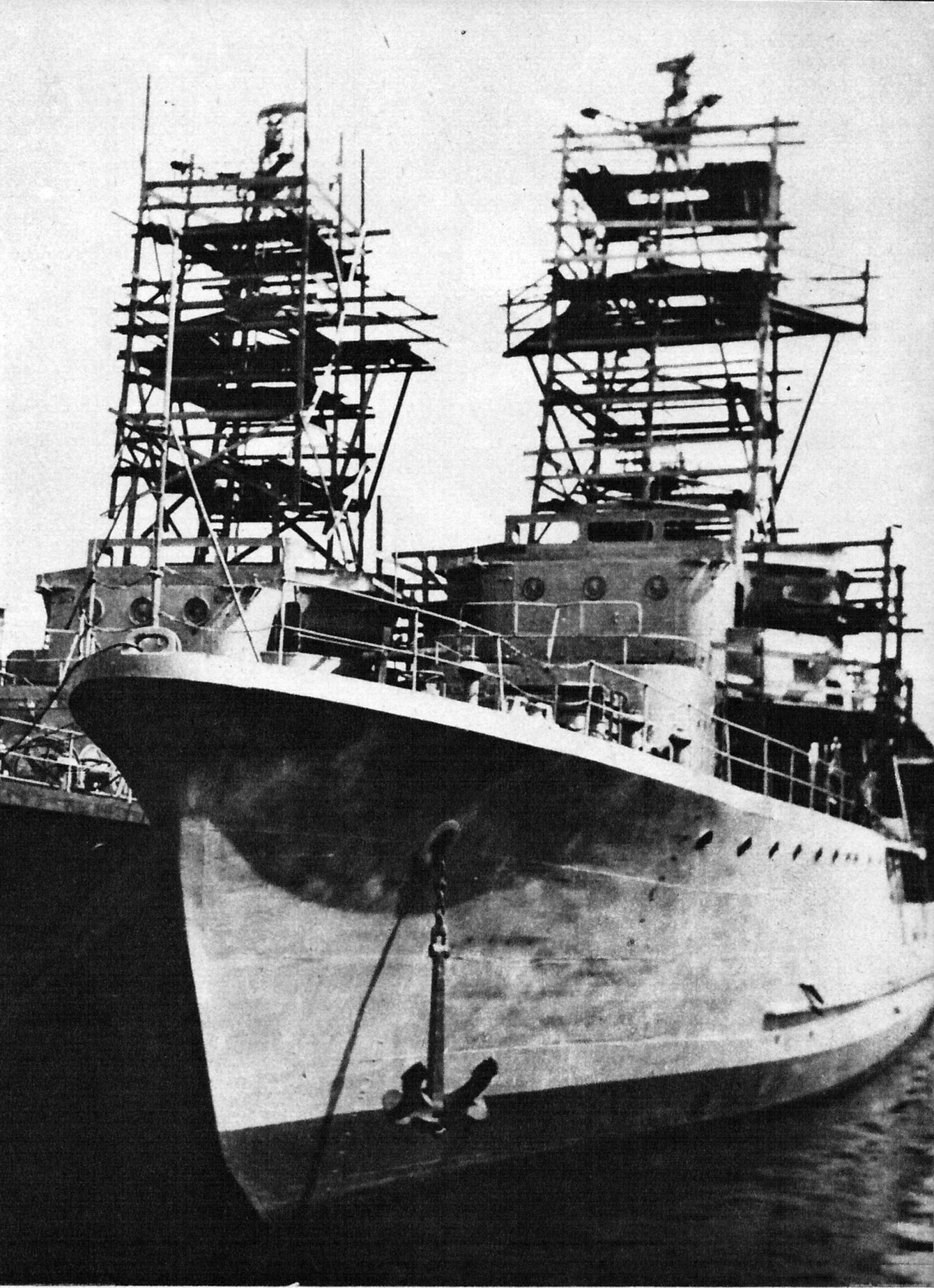
Final stages of construction of Polish T43-class minesweepers

Development of a seagoing base minesweeper began in the Soviet Union in 1943, drawing on experience from constructing and operating Project 58 and Project 263 minesweepers. Initial design work was handled by the CKB-370 design bureau, followed by CKB-17, with the final concept completed by CKB-363 in 1946. The new ships were designed to identify minefield boundaries, clear them, conduct control and reconnaissance sweeps, create passages through minefields, escort vessels behind sweeps, and lay mines. An additional requirement was the ability to detect and destroy submarines. Serial production started in 1947, yielding approximately 180 vessels across variants 254, 254K, 254M, and 254A.

In the early 1950s, Poland's State Economic Planning Commission and Polish General Staff decided to initiate licensed construction of these ships in Polish shipyards, including minesweepers. Technical documentation for Project 254K arrived in Poland in January 1953. Designated "500-ton Minesweeper", "Project 4", and "B 4", the design was approved for serial production on 8 February 1954 by a special commission of the Polish Navy Command. Although construction of a prototype was initially planned for 1953, delays arose as Gdańsk's Central Ship Design Bureau No. 2 struggled to adapt the Soviet documentation to Polish standards, pushing the start to mid-1955. Further delays occurred in September 1955 when an order was issued to build the newer 254M variant, but since construction had already begun – and equipment had been purchased from the Soviet Union – the first three ships (ORP Żubr, ORP Łoś, and ORP Tur) were completed in the original 254K configuration.

ORP Tur was constructed at the Stocznia Gdynia. Its keel was laid on 23 July 1956, it was launched on 22 December of the same year, and it was commissioned into the Polish Navy on 6 August 1957. The ship's name, derived from the extinct land animal aurochs (tur in Polish), broke with the navy's tradition of naming minesweepers after birds or sea creatures.

== Technical specifications ==
ORP Tur was a large, oceangoing minesweeper. Its length overall was 58 metres (54 metres at the waterline), with a beam of 8.5 metres and a draft of 2.3 metres. Constructed entirely of steel with a fully welded hull, the ship was divided into 11 watertight compartments, listed from the bow: I – forepeak and storage, II – chain locker and food stores, III – living and service quarters plus storage, IV – tanks and crew quarters, V – ammunition magazine, VI – auxiliary machinery, VII – engine room, VIII – storage and ammunition magazine, IX – propeller shafts and crew quarters, X – minesweeping gear storage, and XI – steering gear room and chemical/uniform stores. A double hull running nearly the full length of the hull housed fuel tanks, water tanks, and bilges. Beneath the raised forecastle were a paint store, anchor gear, officers' mess, officers' cabins, and petty officers' quarters. Further aft, the superstructure contained radio equipment rooms, a galley, chimney ducts, an auxiliary generator, and the cable drum for the electromagnetic sweep.

The two-and-a-half-level forward superstructure included the commander's quarters, cipher room, radio cabins, radar operator room, bridge, navigation cabin with a sonar station, and, atop, a covered command post with a tall tripod mast supporting radar antennas and a searchlight. Standard displacement was 500 tons, with a full load of 597 tons. Propulsion came from two reversible, turbocharged, four-stroke diesel engines (9D model), delivering a combined 2,200 horsepower (hp) to two fixed-pitch propellers. Maximum speed was 14 knots (8.3 knots while sweeping). Range was 2,200 nautical miles at 14 knots, 3,200 nautical miles at 10 knots, and 1,500 nautical miles with sweeps at 7 knots. Endurance was 7 days.

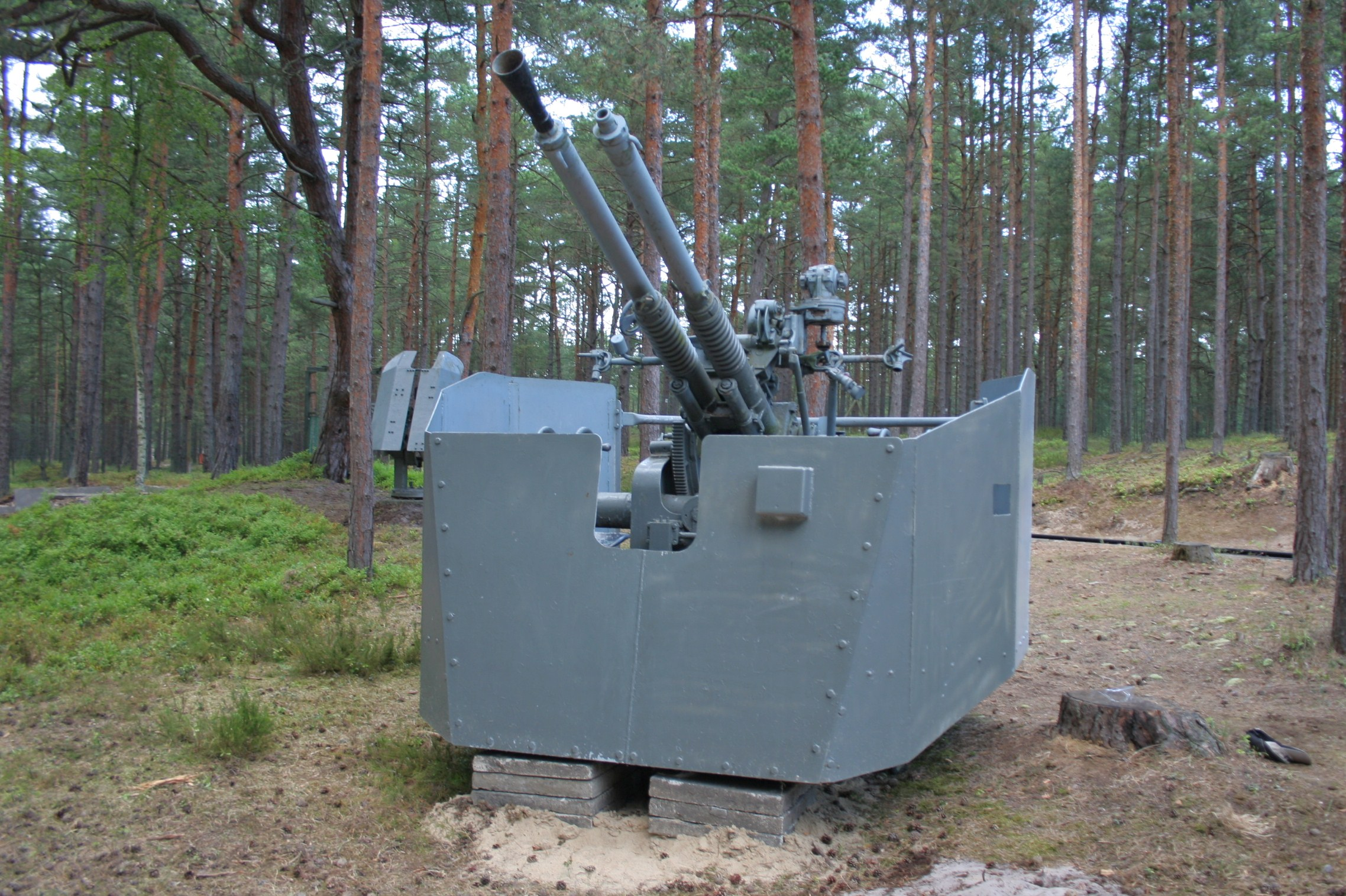
W-11M 37 mm artillery mount

The ship's artillery armament consisted of two twin W-11M 37 mm L/70 anti-aircraft guns, mounted on the forecastle and boat deck, with 1,000 rounds per barrel. Their practical range was 7,000 metres horizontally, with an effective anti-aircraft ceiling of about 4,000 metres. Four twin DShK 2M-1 12.7 mm L/79 heavy machine guns were also fitted – two on the forward superstructure and two on the boat deck flanking the funnel – with 2,000 rounds per barrel. Anti-submarine warfare armament included two BMB-1 depth charge throwers with a stock of 10 B-1 depth charges. The ship had two mine rails, capable of carrying 10 KB-3 naval mines or 16 wz. 08/39 mines. Minesweeping gear included two MT-1 or MT-2 contact sweeps, one TEM-52 electromagnetic sweep, and two BAT-2 acoustic sweeps.

Electronic equipment comprised the Kremnij-2 IFF system (with Fakieł-MZ transmitter and Fakieł-MO receiver), an UHF R-609 radio, a HF R-644 transmitter, an HF R-671 receiver, a full-range R-675 receiver, an ARP-50-1,2M radio direction finder, a Tamir-11 sonar, and a Lin-M general surveillance radar. Additional gear included launchers for eight MDSz smoke candles, an 800 kilogram-force cable winch, two 3-ton minesweeping davits, a 10-oar lifeboat, and life rafts. The crew numbered 77 officers, petty officers, and sailors.

== Service history ==
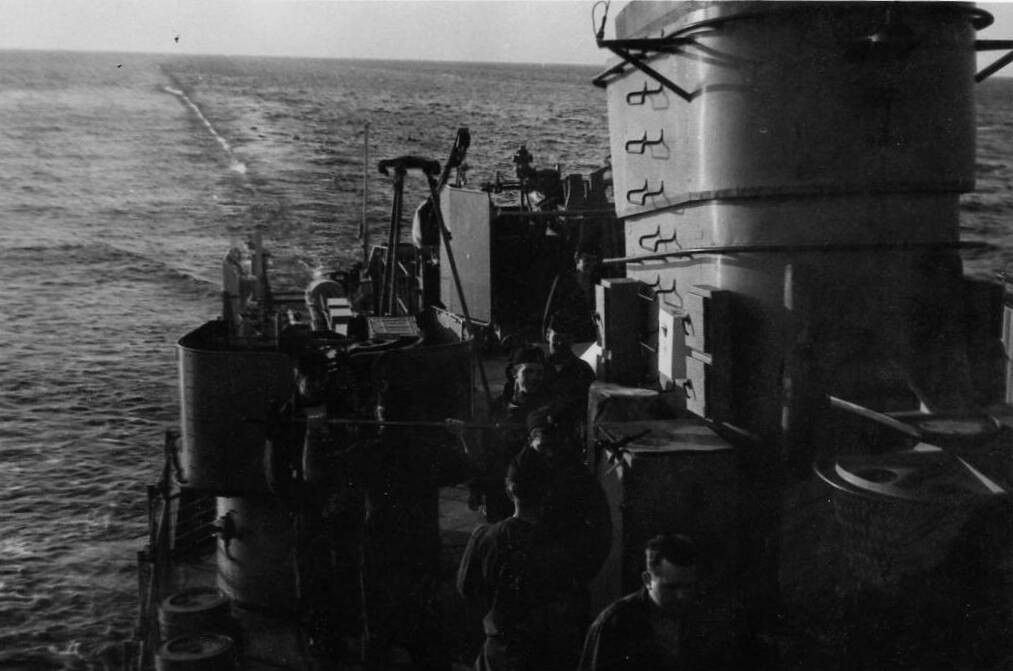
A Polish Project 254 minesweeper during sweeping operations

ORP Tur was first commanded by Lieutenant Zenon Kulej in August 1957. Initially bearing the hull number T-62, it served in the Minesweeper Squadron of the Main Base Water Area Defence Brigade, stationed at Hel. In 1959, the ship made its public debut to Polish audiences during Sea Holiday in Szczecin. That year, it swept the roadstead off Kołobrzeg. On 4 January 1960, its hull number changed to 602. That same year, it searched for mines near the port of Oksywie. Routine service was interspersed with foreign visits, including a trip to Leningrad in November 1960 and to Tallinn in September the following year.

In April 1964, ORP Tur, alongside sister ships ORP Żubr and ORP Łoś, was transferred to Świnoujście and incorporated into the newly formed Base Minesweeper Group, established by Navy Command Order No. 055/Org. on 20 August 1964. Following a fleet reorganization in June 1965, it was assigned to the 12th Base Minesweeper Squadron of the 8th Coastal Defence Flotilla, remaining based in Świnoujście. In December 1965, it participated in a rescue operation for the submarine ORP Sęp, which suffered an explosion and fire in its battery compartment; after the fire was extinguished, the submarine was towed to Świnoujście. Beyond sweeping duties, the ship conducted patrols, including in the Danish Straits, and joint exercises with the 2nd Landing Ship Brigade.

In 1969, it joined its Świnoujście-based sister ships in the Warsaw Pact exercise Odra – Nysa 69, and on 28 June 1970, it took part in a naval parade marking the 25th anniversary of the Polish People's Republic Navy. In late August 1970, it searched for British non-contact mines in international waters of the Bay of Mecklenburg. In summer 1972, it inspected the northern waterway to Świnoujście used by passenger ferries. In subsequent years, it frequently participated in landing support exercises, training cruises with cadets from the Polish Naval Academy, and lengthy patrol missions. In June 1975, it joined the Poseidon-75 exercise. The ship made two foreign port visits: Copenhagen in April 1959 and Peenemünde from February to March 1984. During its long service, the ship's electronic equipment was upgraded. In the 1970s, the Lin-M radar was replaced with the TRN-823, the R-609 radio with the R-619, and the ARP-50-1,2M direction finder with receivers for the British Decca radionavigation system.

In 1978, while the ship was undergoing scheduled maintenance at the Polish Navy Shipyard in Gdynia, a decision was made to convert the vessel into a research ship – a platform for testing new radar surveillance systems. On 18 March of that year, the ship ended its service as a minesweeper and was assigned to the Navy's Communications Directorate, retaining its name and hull number. All equipment used for laying and destroying mines was removed, along with most of the armament, leaving only the forward twin 37 mm gun mount and two 2M-1 mounts beside the funnel. In place of the aft W-11M mount, a four-legged lattice mast for radar antennas and a container for radar equipment operators were installed. The SRN-7453 Nogat radar station was mounted on the ship, and tests were conducted with a prototype Polish radar station, the NUR-25 with a parabolic antenna, produced by Radwar. In the 1980s, the Bras radionavigation system (with Hałs receiver) was installed, along with tests of the experimental Przepiórka jamming missile launcher (mounted in front of the bridge), and two 12-barrel Derkacz decoy launchers of 70 mm calibre (replacing the removed 2M-1 mounts on both sides of the funnel). In 1982, the ship took part in missile firing exercises by Polish Project 205 missile boats near Baltiysk, serving as a relay vessel.

ORP Tur was decommissioned on 31 October 1991 after nearly 35 years of service, as the last of the Polish ships of Project 254. While awaiting scrapping, the ship sank during a storm on 14 January 1993 while moored at the quay in the Gdynia-Oksywie Naval Port. It was later raised and scrapped.

== Bibliography ==
- Rochowicz, Robert (2016). "Uniwersalne oracze morza. Trałowce bazowe projektu 254" [Universal Sea Plows: Project 254 Base Minesweepers]. Morza i Okręty (in Polish) (2): 7. ISSN 2450-2499.
