= Sea Holiday =

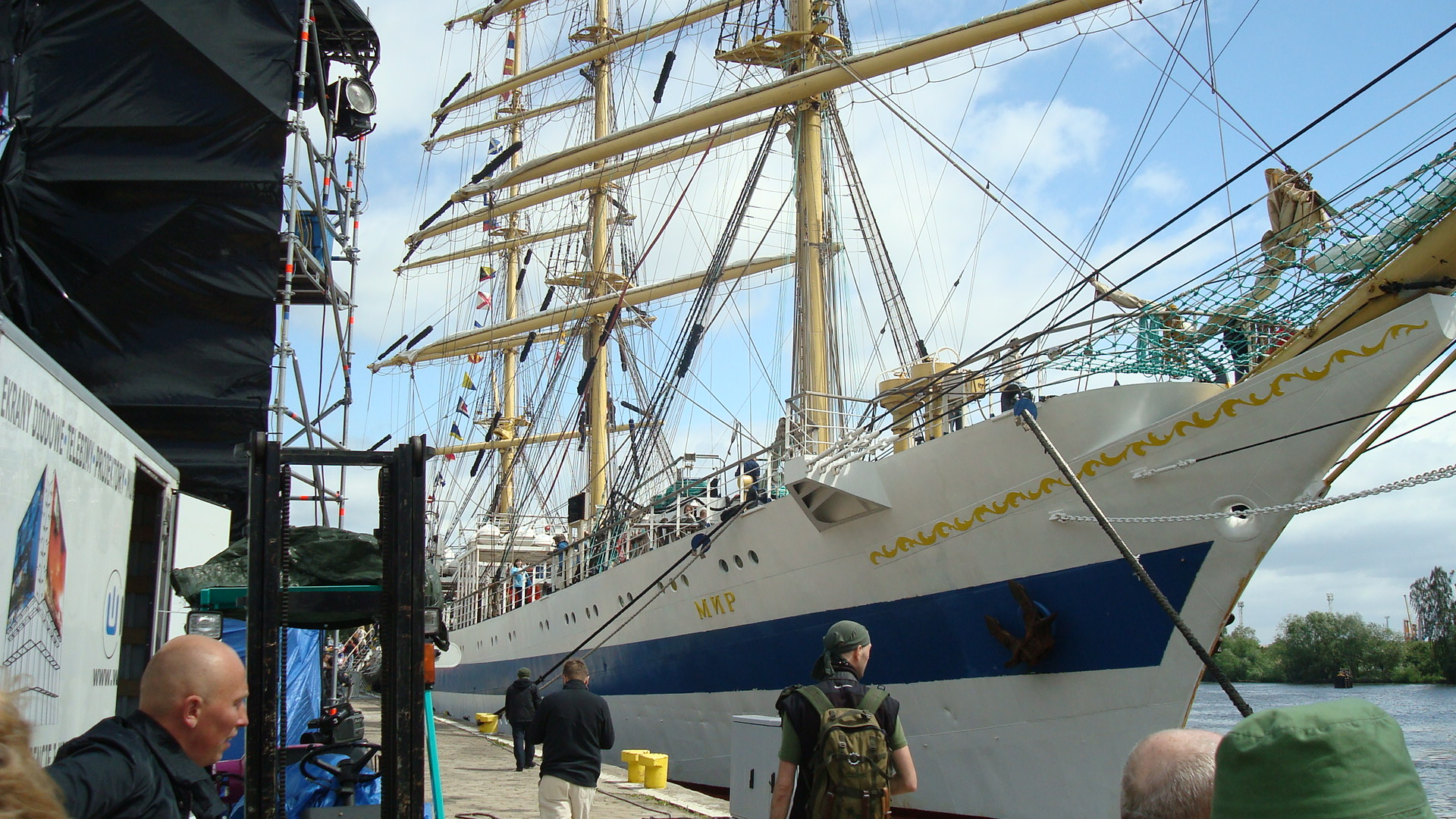
STS Mir during the celebrations of the Sea Days in Szczecin in 2009.

The Sea Holiday, (Note: Polish: Święto Morza) also known as the Sea Days, (Note: Polish: Dni Morza) is an annual festivity is various cities in Poland, located at the Baltic Sea. It is a celebration of sailors, stevedores, fishermen, shipbuilders, and other workers of industries connected with the sea, and usually include ship parades, fireworks, wreaths, and art installations. It was first held in 1932.

== History ==
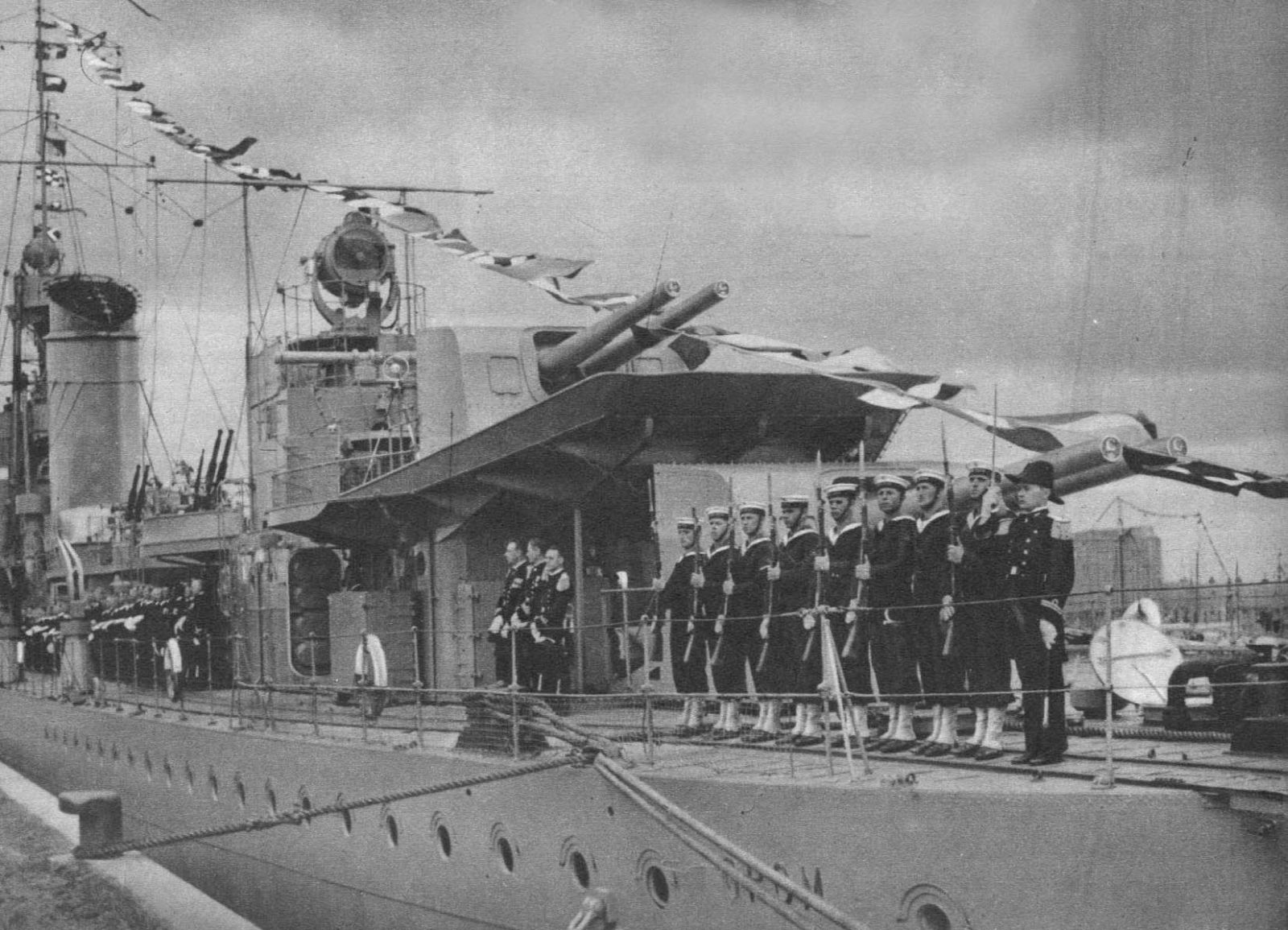
ORP Grom during the celebrations of the Sea Holiday in Gdynia in 1937.

The Sea Holiday has its beginning in the year 1923, and was incited by Antoni Abraham, Jan Radtke, and Stefan Żeromski. However, the first celebrations took place in 1932 in Gdynia, initiated by Andrzej Wachowiak and the Maritime and Colonial League. Since then, it became an annual festival, traditionally hold on 29 June. The celebrations aimed to popularize the topics related to the sea, as well as promote the good image of the Polish Navy and the shipbuilding industry. In the celebrations participated thousands of people, including notable politicians and religious leaders.

The celebrations did not take place during the World War II, which lasted from 1939 to 1945. At that time the city of Gdynia was under the occupation by the Nazi Germany. Despite that, they were still secretly promoted and celebrated by the resistance movement, including the Pomeranian Griffin, as well as on the ships of the Polish Navy.

The celebrations were again held in 1945 in Gdańsk, after the end of the war, and begun being celebrated in the others cities across the country, including in Kołobrzeg, Puck, Szczecin, Świnoujście, Ustka, and others.
