= Bay of Mecklenburg =

Bay in the Baltic Sea

Coordinates: 54°20′N 11°40′E

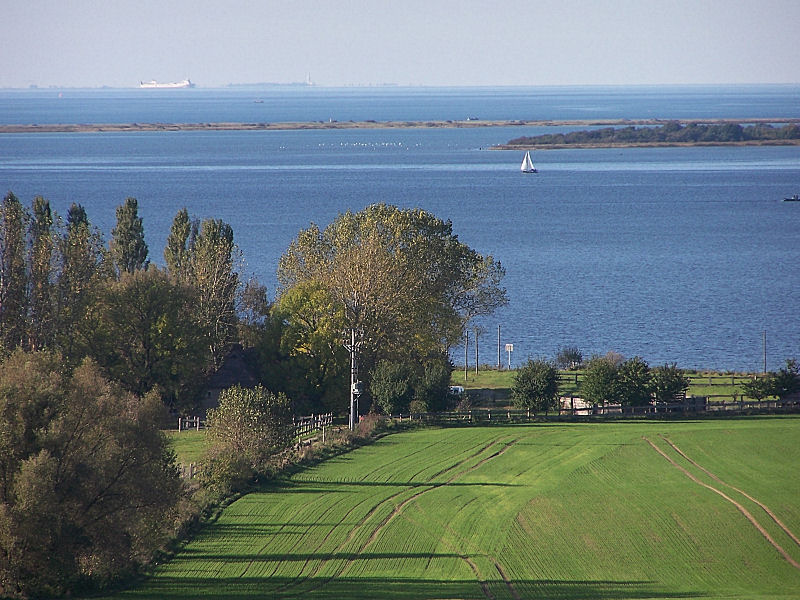
View of the Bay of Mecklenburg from Salzhaff looking towards Fehmarn.

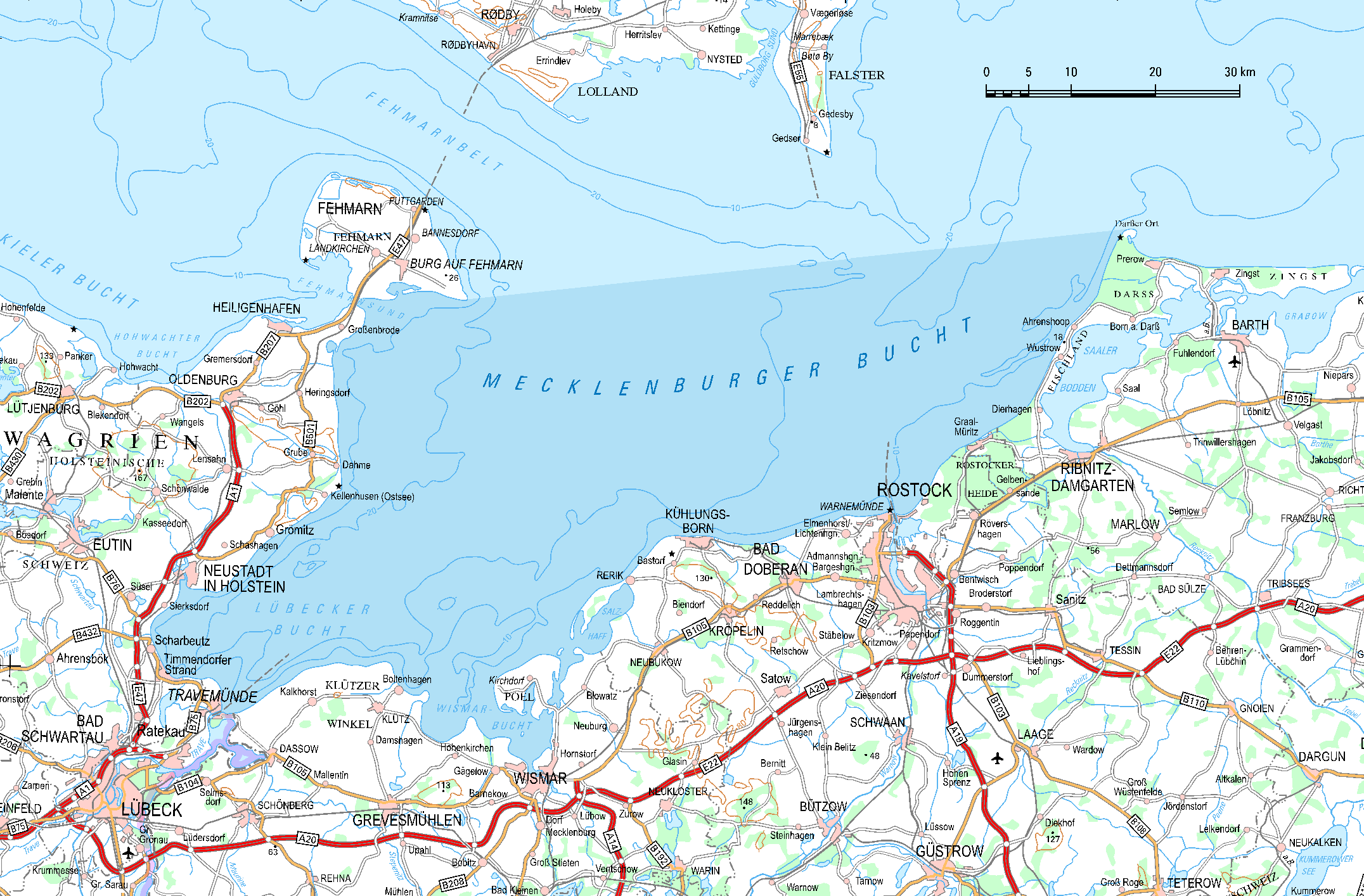
Map of Mecklenburg Bay

The Bay of Mecklenburg (German: Mecklenburger Bucht or Mecklenburgische Bucht; Danish: Mecklenburg Bugt), also known as the Mecklenburg Bay or Mecklenburg Bight, is a long narrow basin making up the southwestern finger-like arm of the Baltic Sea, between the shores of Germany to the south and the Danish islands of Lolland, Falster, and Møn to the north, the shores of Jutland to the west, and joining the largest part of the Baltic to the east.

The Bay of Mecklenburg, which includes the Bay of Wismar and the Bay of Lübeck, connects to the Bay of Kiel in the northwest. Notable ports in the bay are Lübeck, Rostock and Wismar.

== The Blinkerwall ==
In 2024, a 971-metre (3,186 ft) long wall was discovered on the seabed at a depth of 21 metres (69 ft), 10 kilometres (6 mi) off the coast. Named "the Blinkerwall" by its discoverers, the wall is around 1 metre (3 ft) high. Its direction changes when it meets a series of larger boulders. In total, the wall's stones weigh more than 142 tonnes. It is thought to be Europe's oldest megastructure (around 10,000 years old) and may have been used by hunter-gatherers as a driving lane for pursuit of herds of reindeer.

The wall was constructed on land (perhaps on a lake shore) in the period after the Weichselian glaciation, when much of the southern Baltic area was dry land. In the millennia following this, post-glacial rebound caused the Baltic Shield to rise and the southern Baltic area to sink. The waters of the Baltic Sea inundated the site. This process preserves some Stone Age artifacts, which are more likely to have been erased had they remained above water. Stone Age structures have also been discovered in the inundated lands west of Denmark, the area known as Doggerland.

== See also ==
- List of lighthouses and lightvessels in Denmark
- List of lighthouses and lightvessels in Germany
