= T43-class minesweeper =

Class of minesweepers

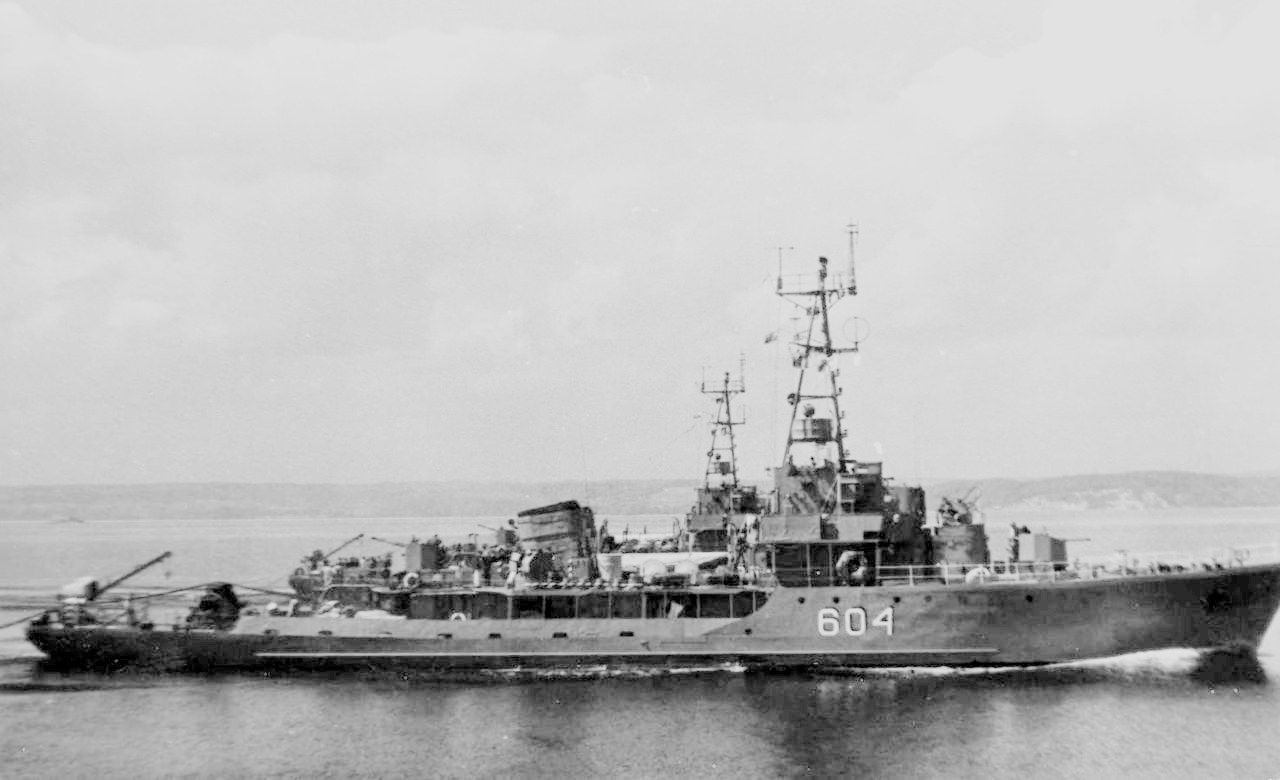
- ORP Dzik, a Polish Navy minesweeper

Class overview
- Name: T43 class
- Builders: Multiple Soviet shipyards; Gdańsk Shipyard; Guangzhou Shipyard; Wuchang Shipyard
- Operators: Soviet Navy; Albanian Naval Force; Algerian National Navy; Bangladesh Navy; Bulgarian Navy; People's Liberation Army Navy; Egyptian Navy; Indonesian Navy; Iraqi Navy; Polish Navy
- Preceded by: Fugas-class minesweeper
- Succeeded by: T58-class minesweeper
- Built: 1948 - c. 1995
- In commission: c. 1950 - present
- Completed: 200+ (Soviet Union); 60+ (China); 12 (Poland)

General characteristics
- Type: Minesweeper
- Displacement: Early: 580 tons (full load); Later: 600 tons (full load)
- Length: Early: 58 m (190 ft 3 in); Later: 60 m (196 ft 10 in)
- Beam: 8.4 m (27 ft 7 in)
- Draught: Early: 2.1 m (6 ft 11 in); Later: 2.3 m (7 ft 7 in)
- Propulsion: 2 x Type 9D diesel engines; 2 shafts; Total output: 2,200 bhp (1,600 kW)
- Speed: 15 knots (28 km/h; 17 mph)
- Range: 3,000 nmi (5,600 km; 3,500 mi) at 10 knots (19 km/h; 12 mph)
- Complement: 65
- Sensors & processing systems: Ball End surface search radar; Neptun navigation radar; Hull-mounted sonar
- Armament: 2 x twin 37 mm/63 cal. guns; 2 x twin 25 mm/80 cal. guns (later ships); 2 x depth charge projectors; 16 x naval mines

The T43 (Projet 254) were a class of open-ocean minesweepers built for the Soviet Navy from 1948 to 1957. It was exported to client states; the People's Republic of China and Poland produced additional ships. Some hulls were converted to other uses by various users. Examples remained in service in 2015.

== Design ==
The hull is made of steel.

Early ships were 58 metres (190 ft) long with a straight-up bridge structure.

Later ships were 60 metres (200 ft) long with a double-level bridge structure and added 25 mm guns.

== Operators ==
People's Socialist Republic of Albania / Albania

Albania received 3 from the Soviet Union in 1960. One retired in 2011, and the second had retired by 2015.

People's Democratic Republic of Algeria / Algeria

Algeria received two from the Soviet Union in 1968. One was cannibalized for parts by 1989. The last was retired by 2009.

Bangladesh

Bangladesh ordered a new ship from China in 1993, based on the Chinese T43 variant, which entered service in 1996. The Tamir-II sonar was replaced by a C-Tech sonar in 1998. It was used mainly as a patrol ship. An order for three more ships was not fulfilled.

People's Republic of Bulgaria / Bulgaria

Bulgaria received three short-hulled ships from the Soviet Union in 1953. By 1989, one was cannibalized for parts and another was used as a spy ship. All were retired by 2009.

People's Republic of China

The People's Republic of China received about four short-hulled ships from the Soviet Union in the 1950s. China constructed over 60 of a variant called Type 6610 or Type 010, most of which were of the long-hull type. Production began in 1956 and continued to at least the early 1990s. Some were converted for other roles, including patrol, surveying, submarine rescue, and civilian research.

Federation of Arab Republics (1972-1984) / Egypt

Egypt received seven ships from the Soviet Union in the 1970s. By 2015, three were in service with the remainder disposed of.

Indonesia

Indonesia received six ships from the Soviet Union, four in 1962 and two in 1964. None were in service by 1989.

Ba'athist Iraq / Iraq

Iraq received two ships from the Soviet Union in 1969. None were in service by 2009.

- Polish People's Republic / Poland

Poland built 12 ships from 1957 to 1962, including four short hulls. Of the short hulls, one was converted into a spy ship, one was retired in 1987, and another was retired in 1988. None were in service by 2009.

Soviet Union

The Soviet Union built over 200 hulls, including those converted to other uses included diving ships, tenders, and KGB patrol ships. They were being phased out in 1989 when only 35 remained in service.

== Sources ==
- Moore, John, ed. (1979). Jane's Fighting Ships 1979-1980. Jane's Information Group. ISBN 0-531-03913-7.
- Saunders, Stephan, ed. (2009). Jane's Fighting Ships 2009-2010. Jane's Information Group. ISBN 978-0710628886.
- Saunders, Stephan, ed. (2015). Jane's Fighting Ships 2015-2016. Jane's Information Group. ISBN 978-0710631435.
- Sharpe, Richard, ed. (1989). Jane's Fighting Ships 1989-1990. Jane's Information Group. ISBN 0-7106-0886-1.
- Wertheim, Eric (2013). The Naval Institute Guide to Combat Fleets of the World: Their Ships, Aircraft, and Systems (16 ed.). Annapolis, Maryland: Naval Institute Press. ISBN 978-1591149545.
