= Compartment (ship) =

Portion of the space within a ship

A compartment is a portion of the space within a ship defined vertically between decks and horizontally between bulkheads. It is analogous to a room within a building, and may provide watertight subdivision of the ship's hull important in retaining buoyancy if the hull is damaged. Subdivision of a ship's hull into watertight compartments is called compartmentation.

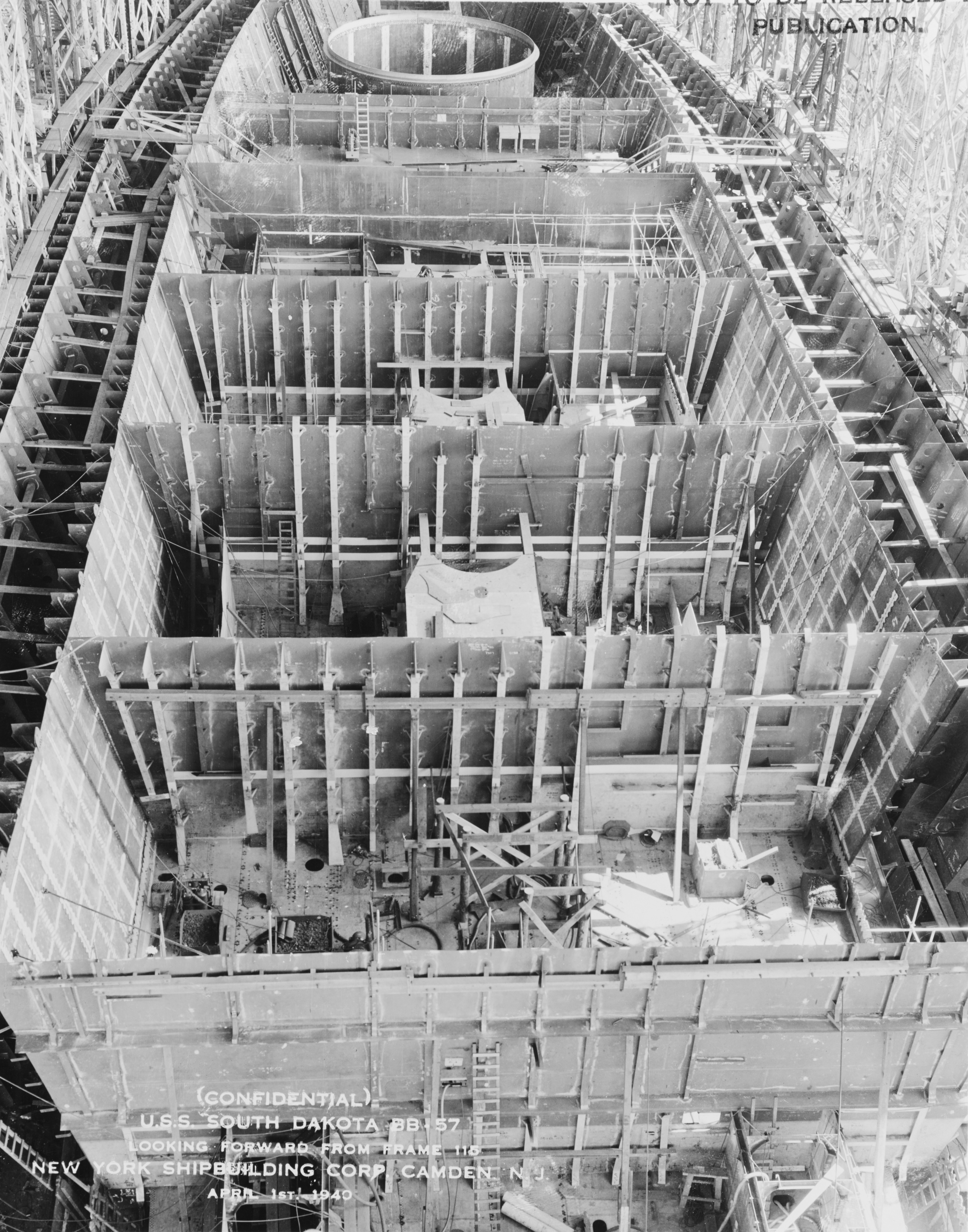
Transverse bulkheads appear horizontally in this photo of the battleship USS South Dakota (BB-57) under construction.

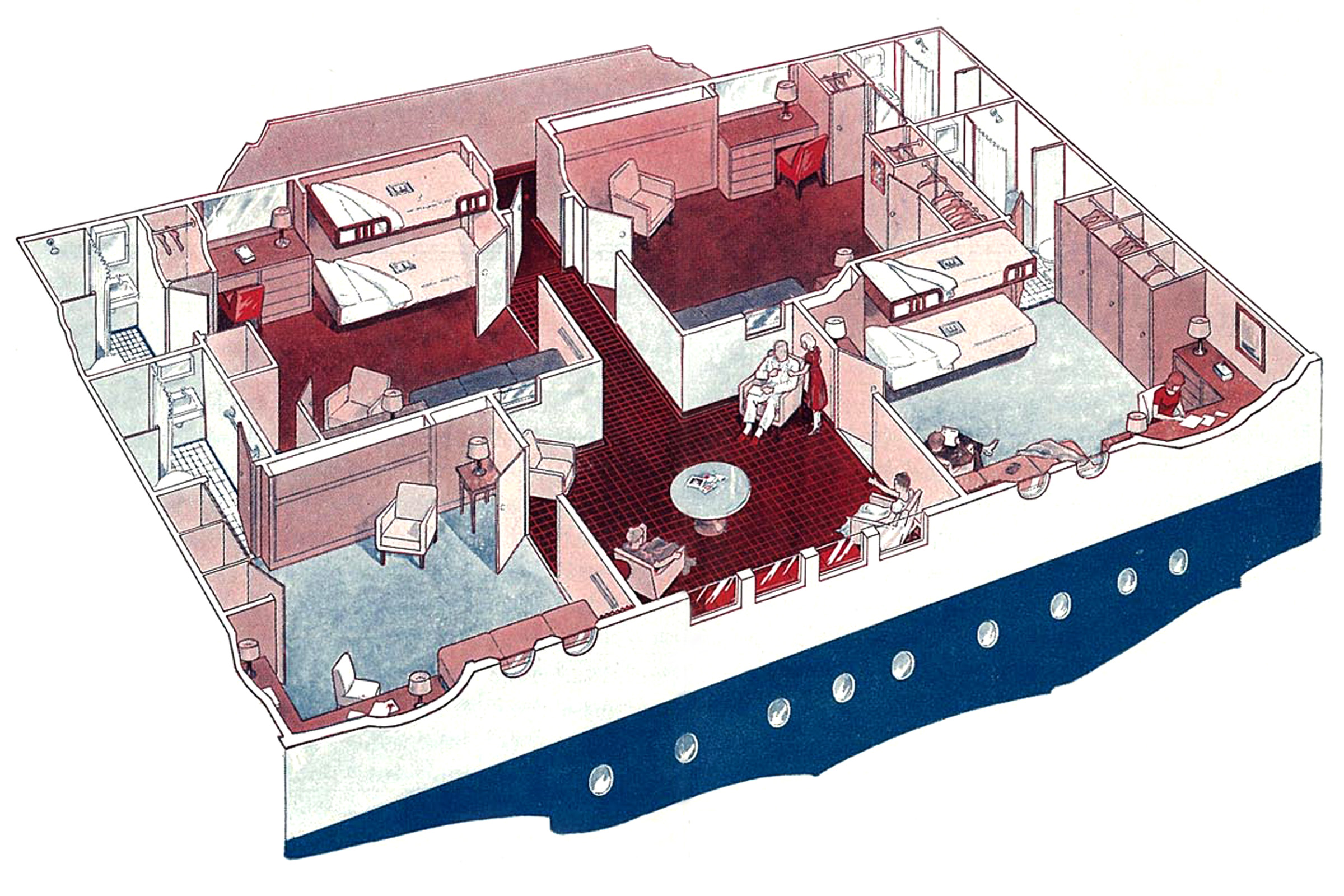
These compartments are formed by non-structural bulkheads.

== History ==
Bulkheads were known to the ancient Greeks, who employed bulkheads in triremes to support the back of rams. By the Athenian trireme era (500 BC), the hull was strengthened by enclosing the bow behind the ram, forming a bulkhead compartment. Instead of using bulkheads to protect ships against ram attacks, Greeks preferred to reinforce the hull with extra timber along the waterline, making larger ships almost resistant to ramming by smaller ones. Similar to how ships of the Age of Sail allocated more timber to strengthen the hull, so that enemy ships had to be close for cannon fire to be damaging.

Bulkhead watertight compartments were originally invented by the Chinese. These compartments strengthened the junks and slowed flooding in case of holing during the Han and Song dynasties. The wide application of Chinese watertight compartments soon spread to the Europeans through the Indian and Arab merchants. As wood began to be replaced by iron in European ships in the 18th century, new structures, like bulkheads, started to become prevalent.

The economics of early unsinkable passenger ships was scrutinized in an 1882 Scientific American article.

== Watertight subdivision ==
Watertight subdivision limits loss of buoyancy and freeboard in the event of damage, and may protect vital machinery from flooding. Most ships have some pumping capacity to remove accumulated water from the bilges, but a steel ship with no watertight subdivision will sink if water accumulates faster than pumps can remove it. Standards of watertight subdivision assume no dewatering capability, although pumps kept in working order may provide an additional measure of safety in the event of minor leaks. The most common watertight subdivision is accomplished with transverse bulkheads dividing the elongated hull into a number of watertight floodable lengths. Early watertight subdivision tested with hoses sometimes failed to withstand the hydrostatic pressure of an adjoining flooded compartment. Effective watertight subdivision requires these transverse bulkheads to be both watertight and structurally sound.

A ship will sink if the transverse bulkheads are so far apart that flooding a single compartment would consume all the ship's reserve buoyancy. Aside from the possible protection of machinery, or areas most susceptible to damage, such a ship would be no better than a ship without watertight subdivision, and is called a one-compartment ship. A ship capable of remaining afloat when any single watertight compartment is flooded is called a two-compartment ship, but damage destroying the tightness of a transverse bulkhead may cause flooding of two compartments and loss of the ship. A ship able to remain afloat with any two compartments flooded is called a three-compartment ship, and will withstand damage to one transverse bulkhead.

After the Titanic sinking, safety standards recommended spacing transverse bulkheads so no single point of damage would either submerge the end of the upper bulkhead deck or reduce bulkhead deck freeboard to less than 3 inches (7.6 cm). Wartime experience with torpedo damage indicated the typical damage diameter of 35 feet (11 m) defined a practical minimum distance for transverse bulkhead spacing.

== Doors ==
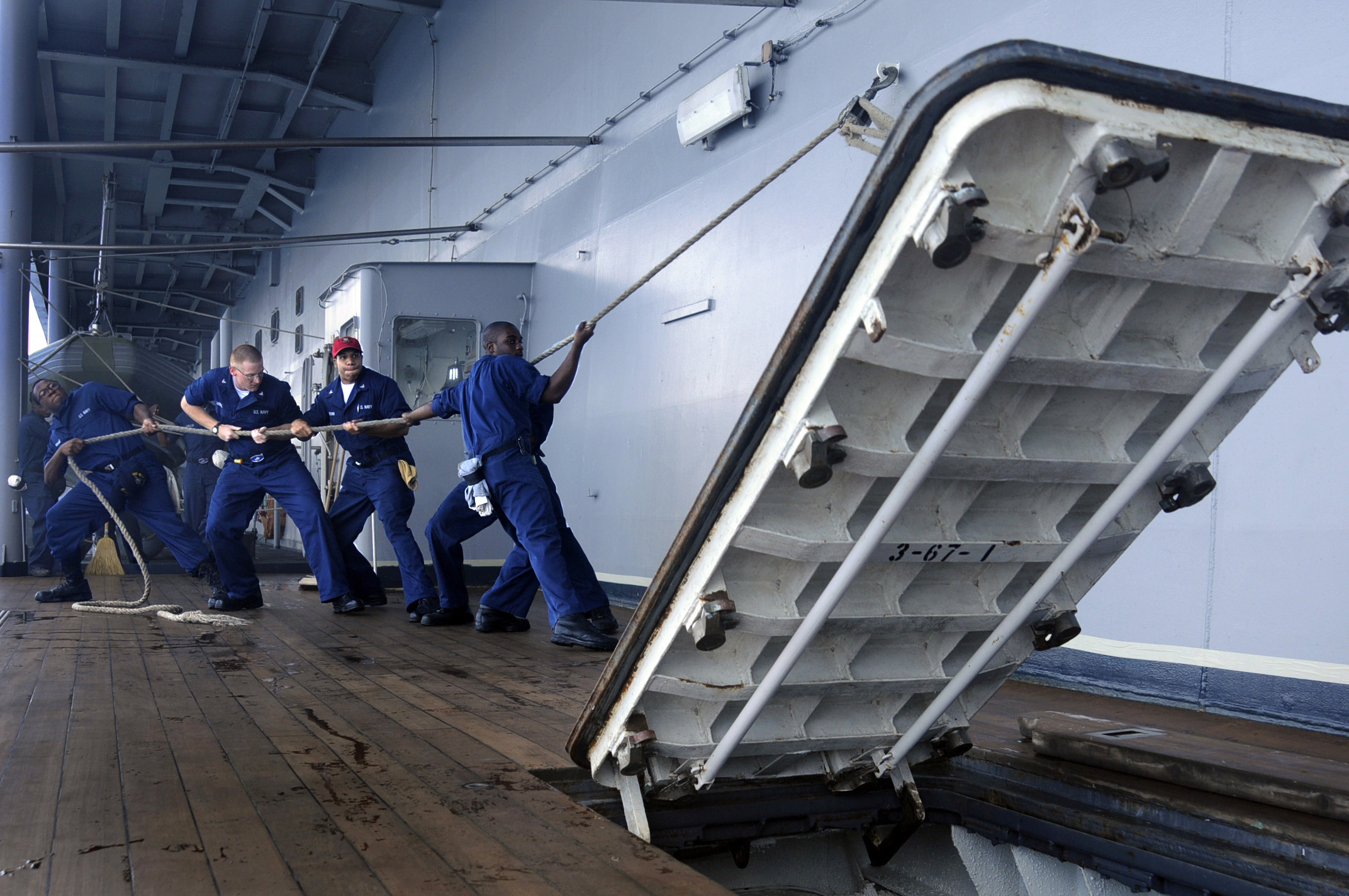
A watertight hatch with the door dogs clearly visible

Three types of doors are commonly used between compartments.

A closed watertight door is structurally capable of withstanding the same pressures as the watertight bulkheads they penetrate, although such doors require frequent maintenance to maintain effective seals, and must, of course, be kept closed to effectively contain flooding.

A closed weathertight door can seal out spray and periodic minor flow over weather decks, but may leak during immersion. These outward opening doors are useful at weather deck entrances to compartments above the main deck.

Joiner doors are similar to doors used in conventional buildings ashore. They afford privacy and temperature control for compartments formed by non-structural bulkheads within the ship's hull.

== Nomenclature ==
Compartments are identified by the deck forming the floor of that compartment. Different types of ships have different deck naming conventions. Passenger ships often use letters of the alphabet sequentially down from A deck (the highest) above B deck, and B deck above C deck, and so forth. Another popular naming convention is numbering the main deck 1, the deck below it 2 (or the second deck), and the deck below that the third deck, and so forth. Decks above the main deck may be named, like the bridge deck or poop deck, or they may be numbered upwards from the main deck with a zero prefix that is pronounced "oh": 01 above the main deck, 02 deck above 01, and so forth.

The United States Navy (USN) has used the latter convention in a compartment numbering system since 1949. The USN system identifies each compartment by a four-part code separated by hyphens. The first part of the code represents a numbered deck, the second part of the code is a hull support frame numbered sequentially from the bow, the third part of the code is a number representing compartment position with respect to the ship's centerline, and the fourth part of the code is alphabetic representing the use of that compartment.

The centerline position code is zero for a compartment on the ship's centerline, odd numbers for compartments entirely to starboard of the centerline, and even numbers for compartments entirely to port. For compartments sharing the same deck and forward frame, the first two parts of the code are identical, and the third part of the code is numbered outward from the centerline. For example, four main-deck compartments at frame 90 would be 1-90-1-L inboard and 1-90-3-L outboard on the starboard side of the ship and 1-90-2-L inboard and 1-90-4-L outboard on the port side.

The fourth part of the code is:

- A for store rooms (or AA for cargo holds)
- C for crewed communication or control centers
- E for crewed engineering machinery spaces
- F for oil storage tanks (or FF for oil cargo tanks)
- G for gasoline-storage tanks (or GG for gasoline cargo tanks)
- J for JP-5 storage tanks (or JJ for JP-5 cargo tanks)
- K for chemical-storage spaces
- L for living spaces, including sleeping, dining, washrooms, sick bay, and passageways
- M for ammunition magazines
- Q for miscellaneous spaces not otherwise coded, including laundry, galley, pantries, wiring trunks, uncrewed engineering, electrical and electronic spaces, shops, and offices
- T for vertical-access trunks (escape trunks)
- V for void (empty) spaces
- W for water-storage tanks

== See also ==
- Ship floodability
