= List of cities in the Baltic states by population =

This is a list of the most populous cities in the three Baltic states: Lithuania, Latvia, and Estonia. The population figures, measured within city limits on a national level, have been estimated by each of the three corresponding national statistical institutions: State Data Agency of Lithuania, Central Statistical Bureau of Latvia, and Statistics Estonia. The Lithuanian data is presented biannually, for January and July, whereas calculations from other countries is presented only for 1 January.

Of the top 30 cities by population in the Baltic countries, 15 are situated in Lithuania, 10 in Latvia, and 5 in Estonia.

== Largest cities ==
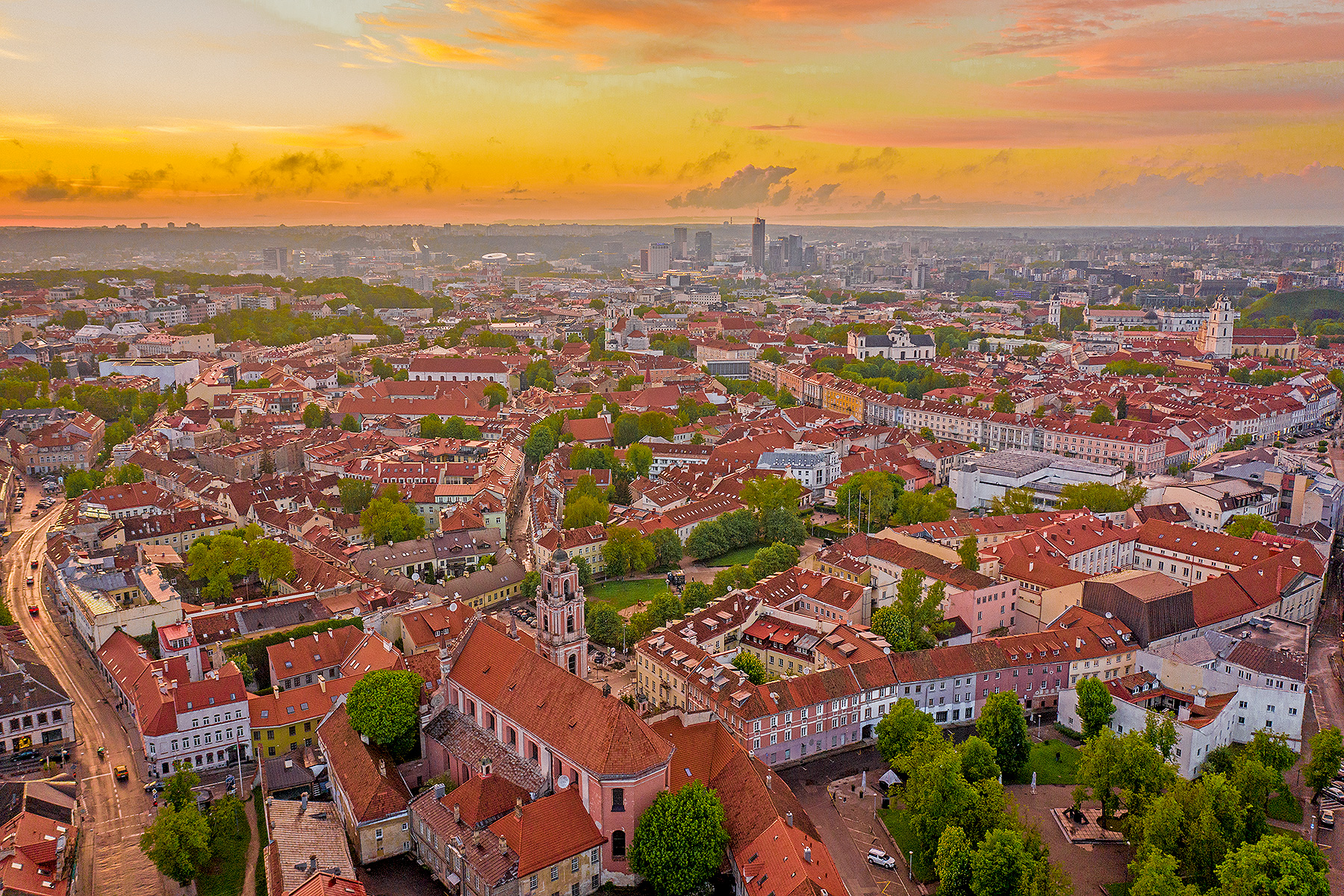
1. Vilnius

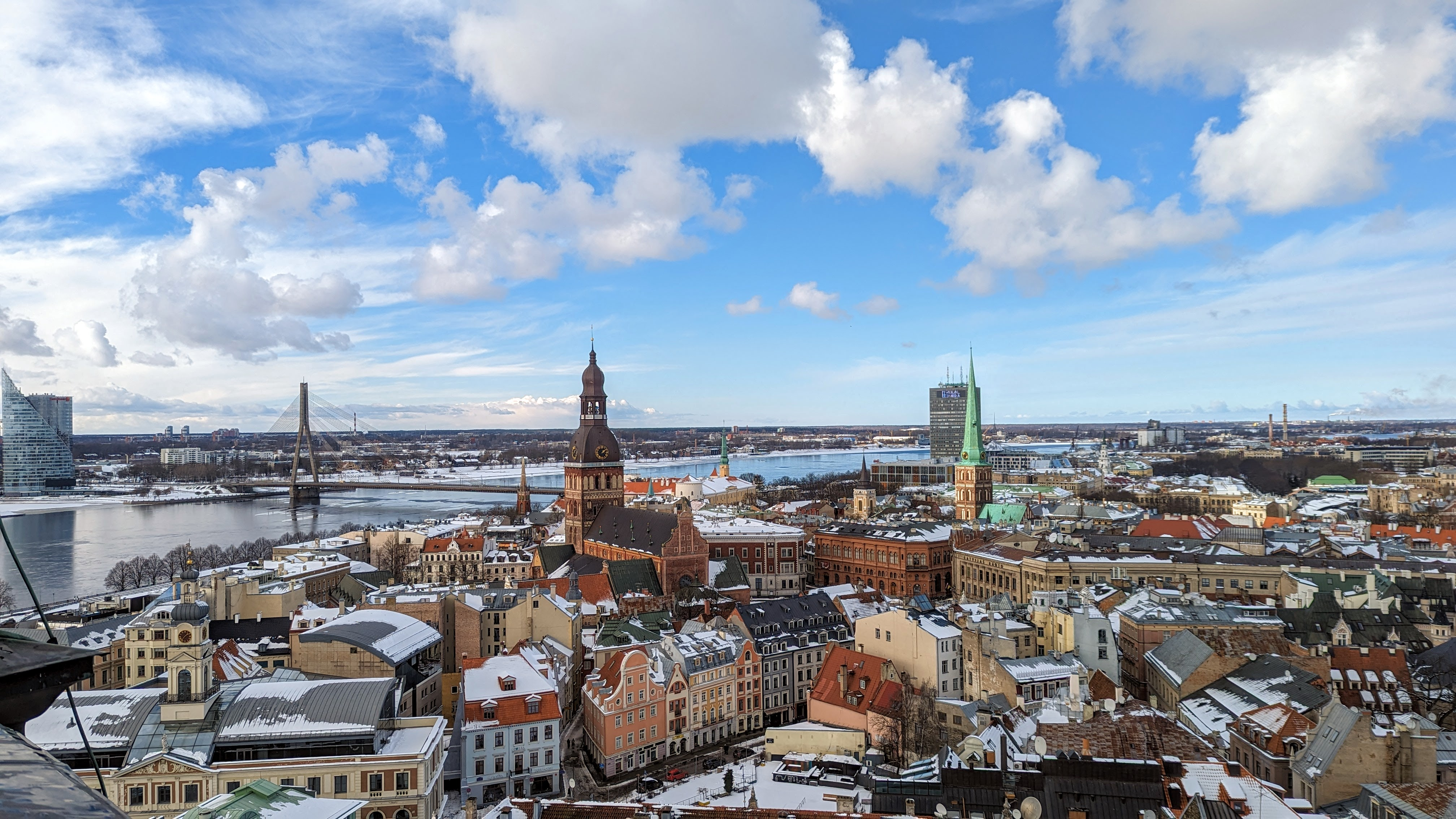
2. Riga

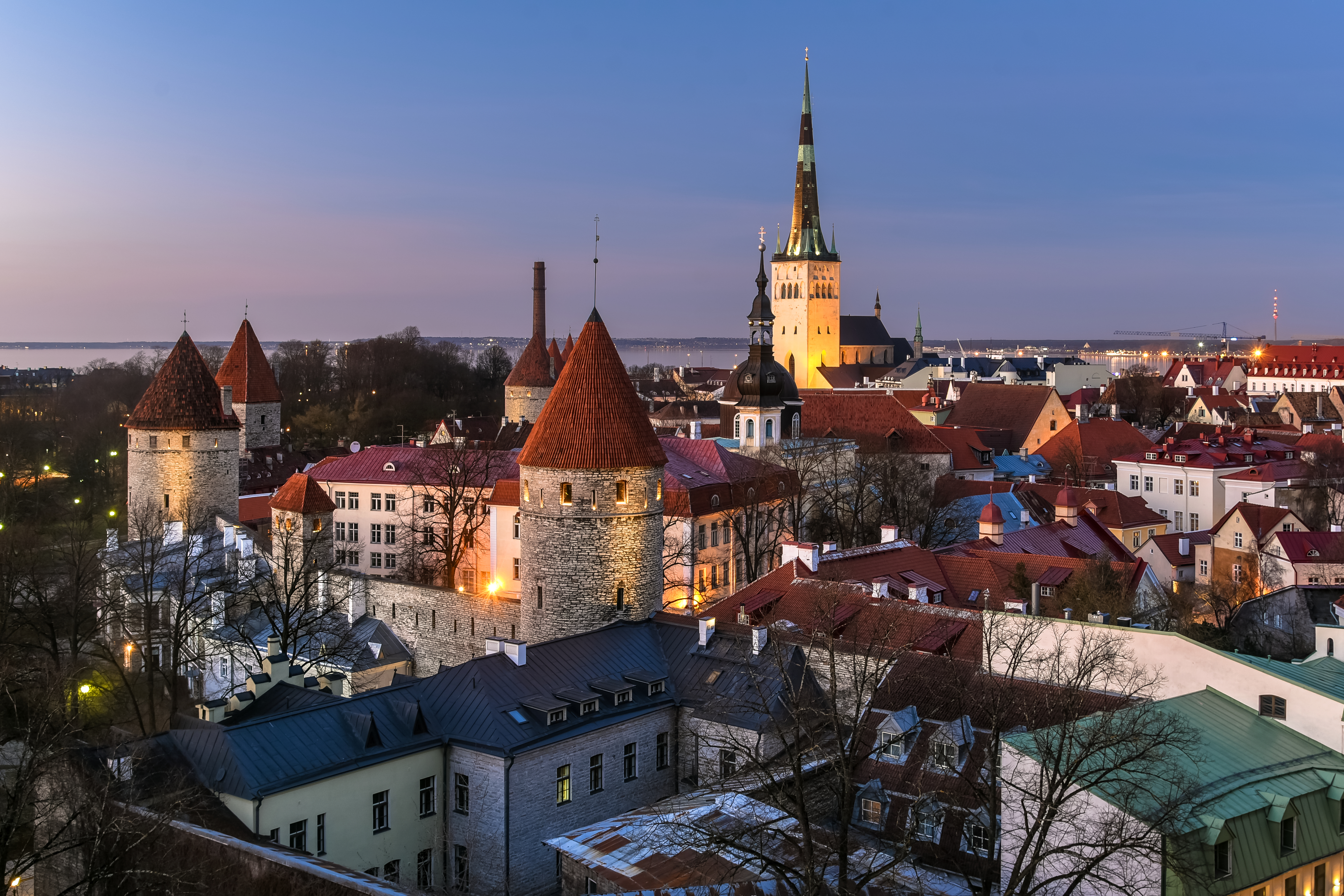
3. Tallinn

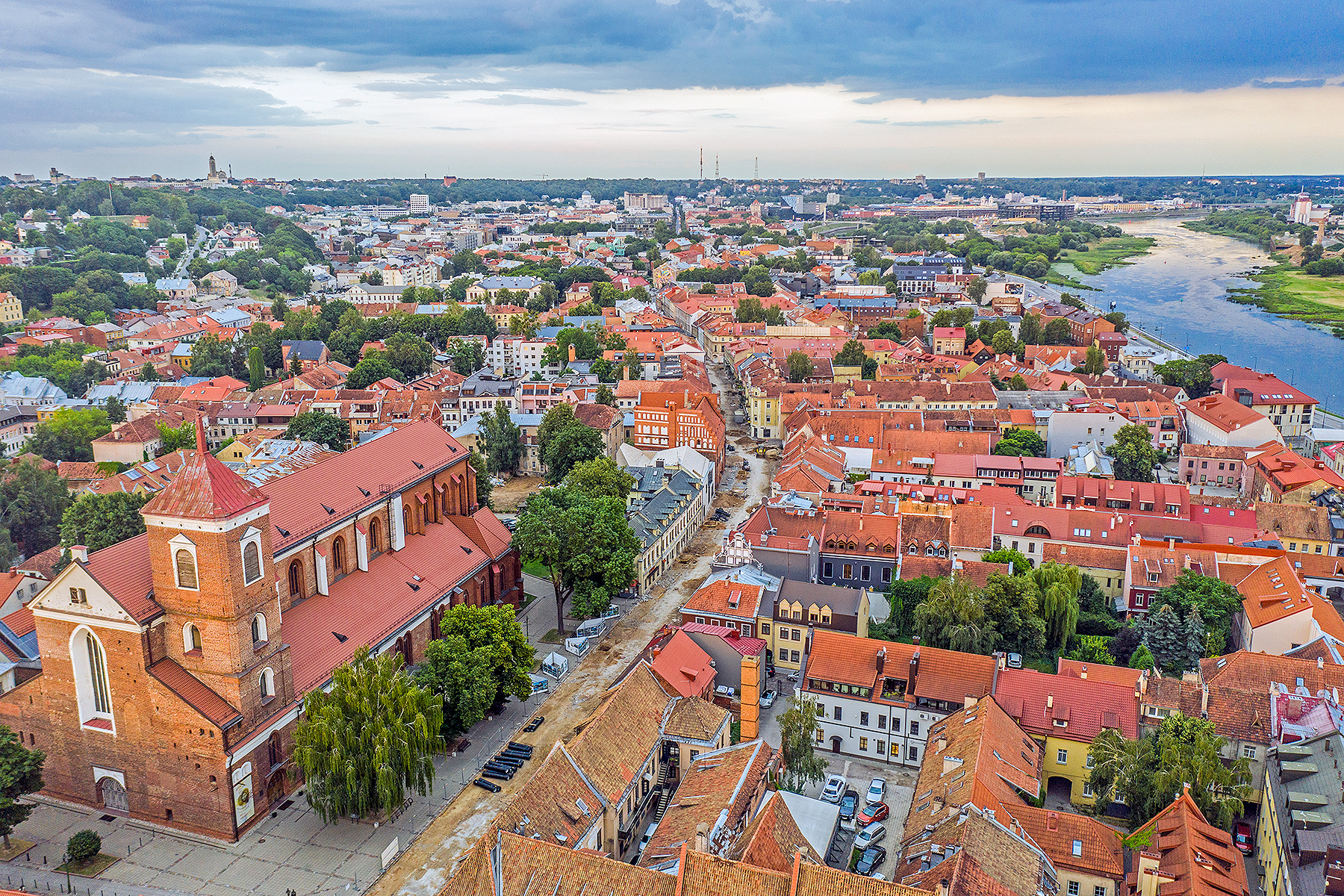
4. Kaunas

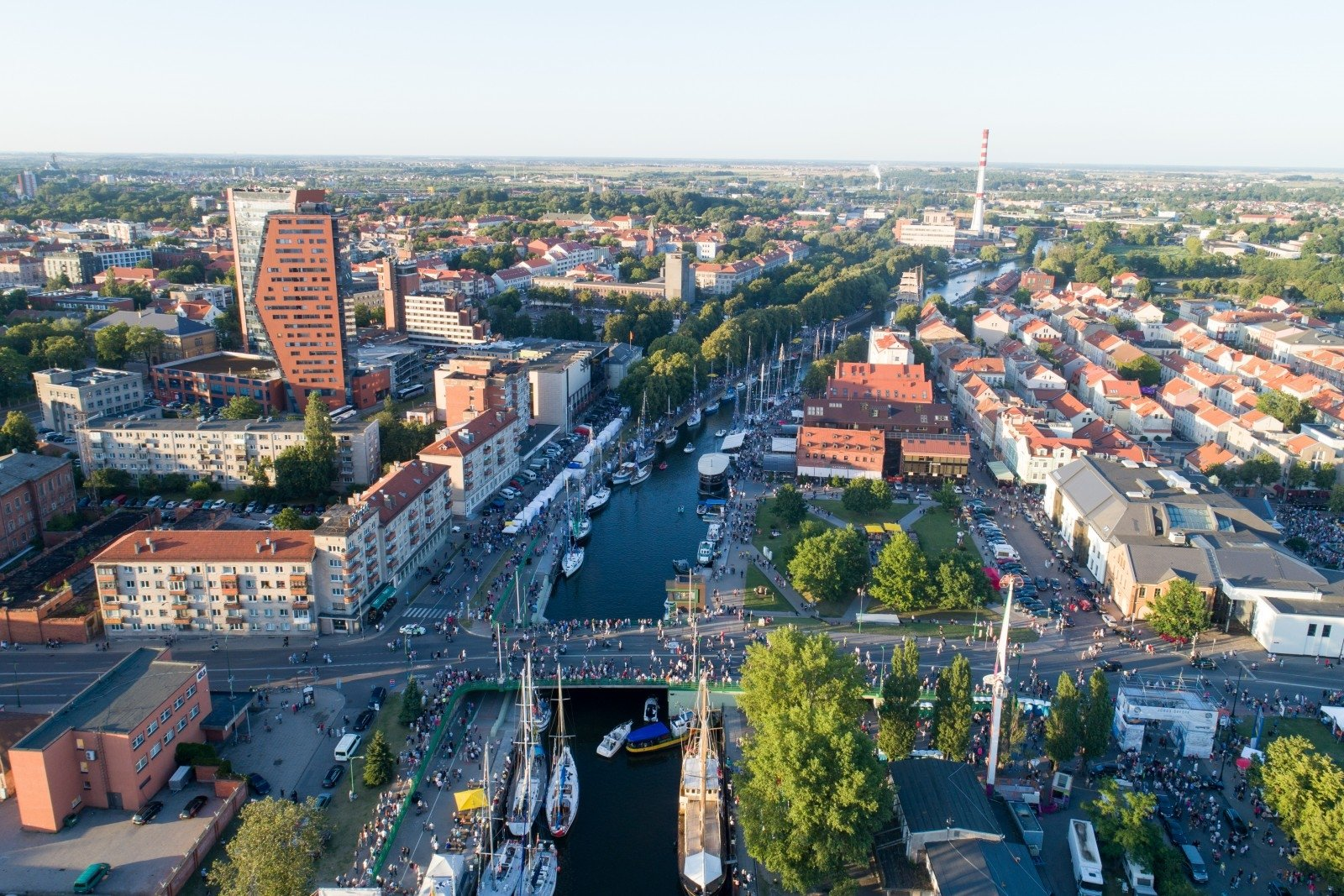
5. Klaipėda

Rank	City	Population	Date	Country
1.	Vilnius (Note: Comprises data of the cities of Vilnius and Grigiškės, which amalgamate the Municipality)	619,405	2026	Lithuania
2.	Riga	588,911	2026	Latvia
3.	Tallinn	452,563	2026	Estonia
4.	Kaunas	303,613	2026	Lithuania
5.	Klaipėda	160,295	2026	Lithuania
6.	Šiauliai	111,359	2026	Lithuania
7.	Tartu	96,506	2026	Estonia
8.	Panevėžys	83,857	2026	Lithuania
9.	Daugavpils	77,486	2026	Latvia
10.	Liepāja	66,746	2026	Latvia
11.	Jelgava	54,408	2026	Latvia
12.	Jūrmala	52,926	2026	Latvia
13.	Narva	51,411	2026	Estonia
14.	Alytus	49,467	2026	Lithuania
15.	Pärnu	40,934	2026	Estonia
16.	Marijampolė	35,672	2026	Lithuania
17.	Mažeikiai	32,664	2026	Lithuania
18.	Ventspils	32,479	2026	Latvia
19.	Kohtla-Järve	32,368	2026	Estonia
20.	Utena	26,125	2026	Lithuania
21.	Jonava	26,119	2026	Lithuania
22.	Rēzekne	25,978	2026	Latvia
23.	Kėdainiai	23,190	2026	Lithuania
24.	Valmiera	22,746	2026	Latvia
25.	Ogre	22,499	2026	Latvia
26.	Tauragė	21,656	2026	Lithuania
27.	Telšiai	21,350	2026	Lithuania
28.	Ukmergė	20,857	2026	Lithuania
29.	Jēkabpils	20,685	2026	Latvia
30.	Palanga	19,545	2026	Lithuania

== Map ==
Locations of the largest cities in the Baltic states. The 10 largest are bolded.

== See also ==
- List of cities in Lithuania
- List of towns in Lithuania
- List of cities and towns in Latvia
- List of cities and towns in Estonia
- List of cities and towns around the Baltic Sea
- List of metropolitan areas by population
- List of urban areas in the Nordic countries
