= List of cities and towns around the Baltic Sea =

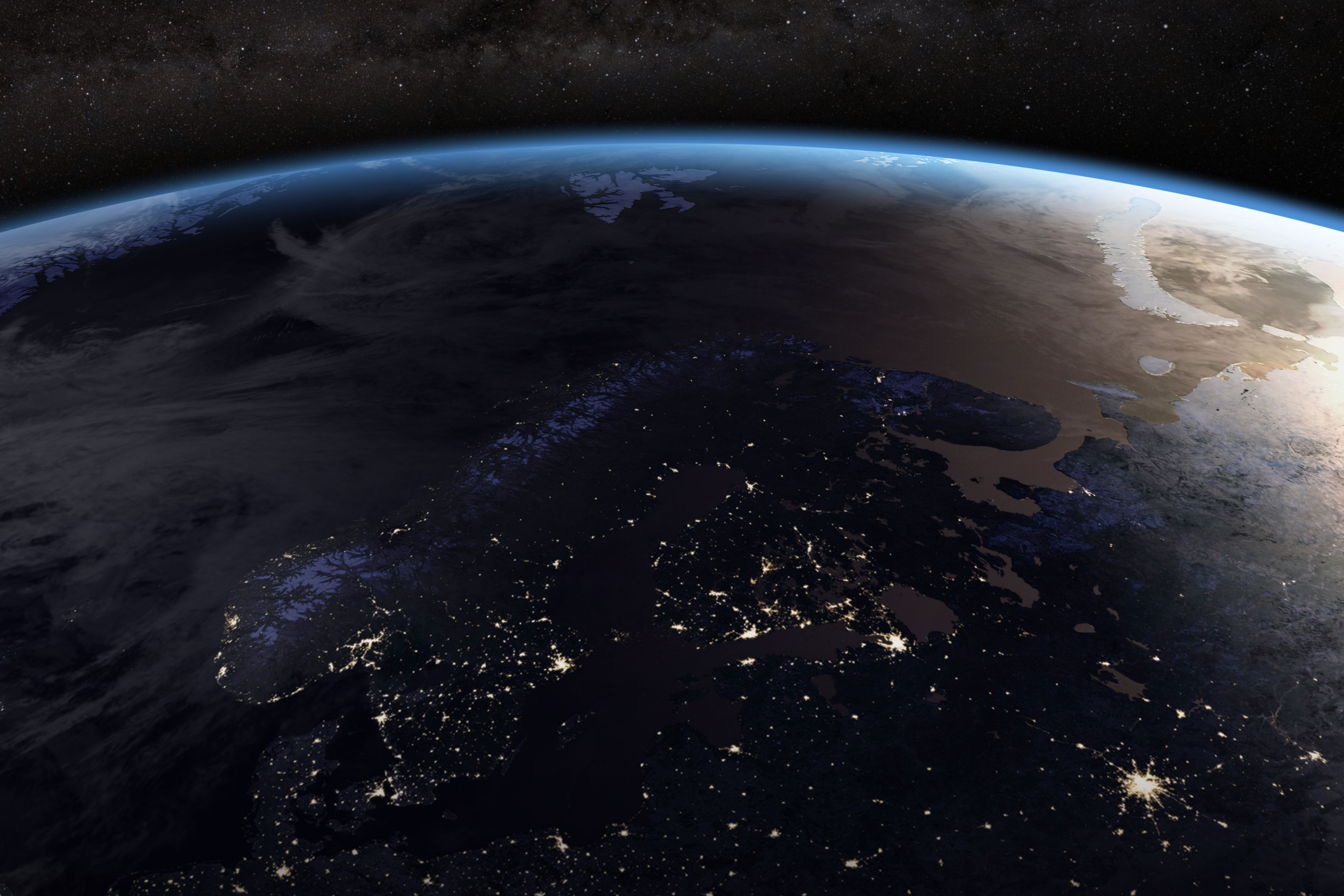
The Baltic sea urban areas seen from space.

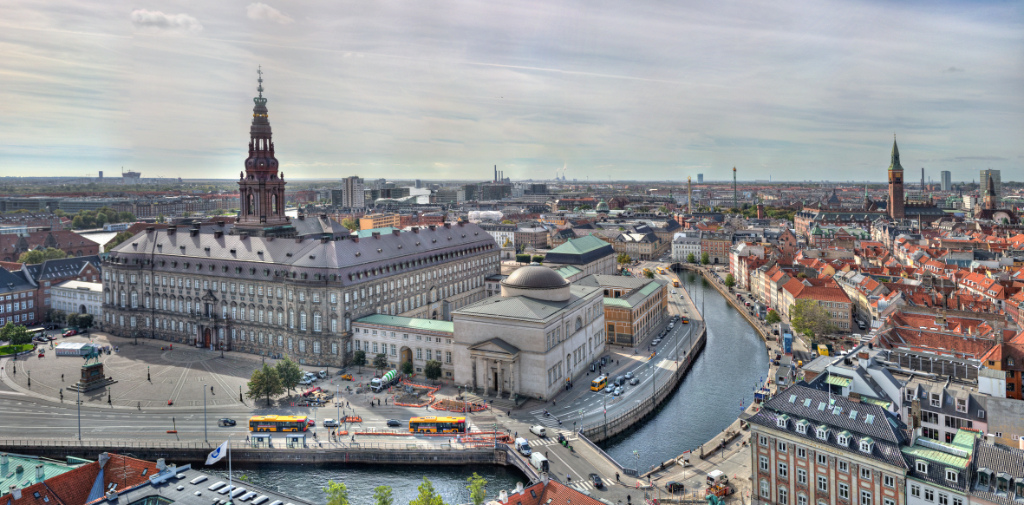
Spit of Christiansborg Palace, in Copenhagen, Denmark

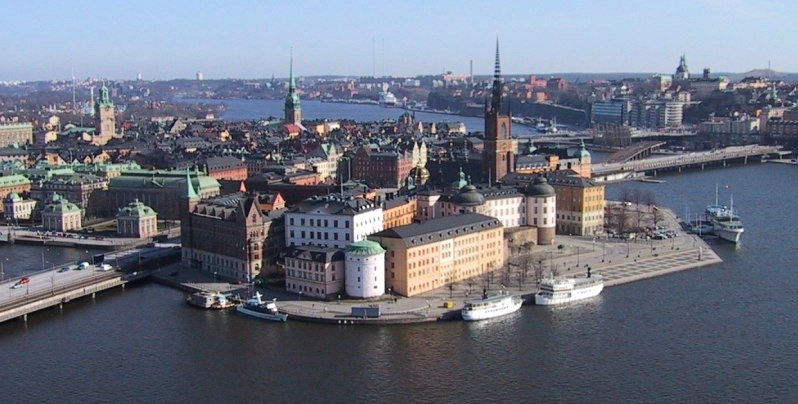
Riddarholmen in Stockholm, Sweden

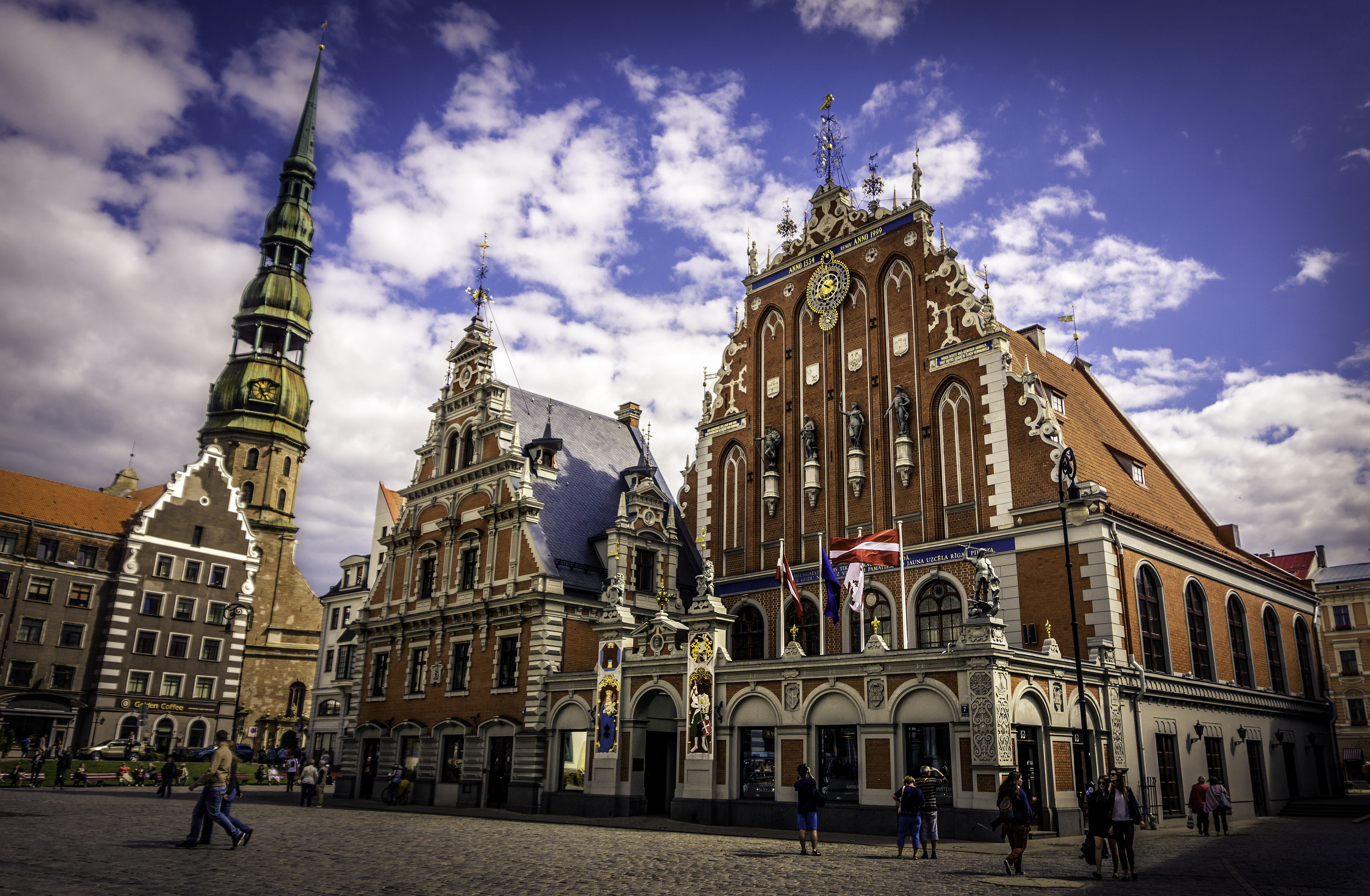
House of the Blackheads (Riga), Latvia

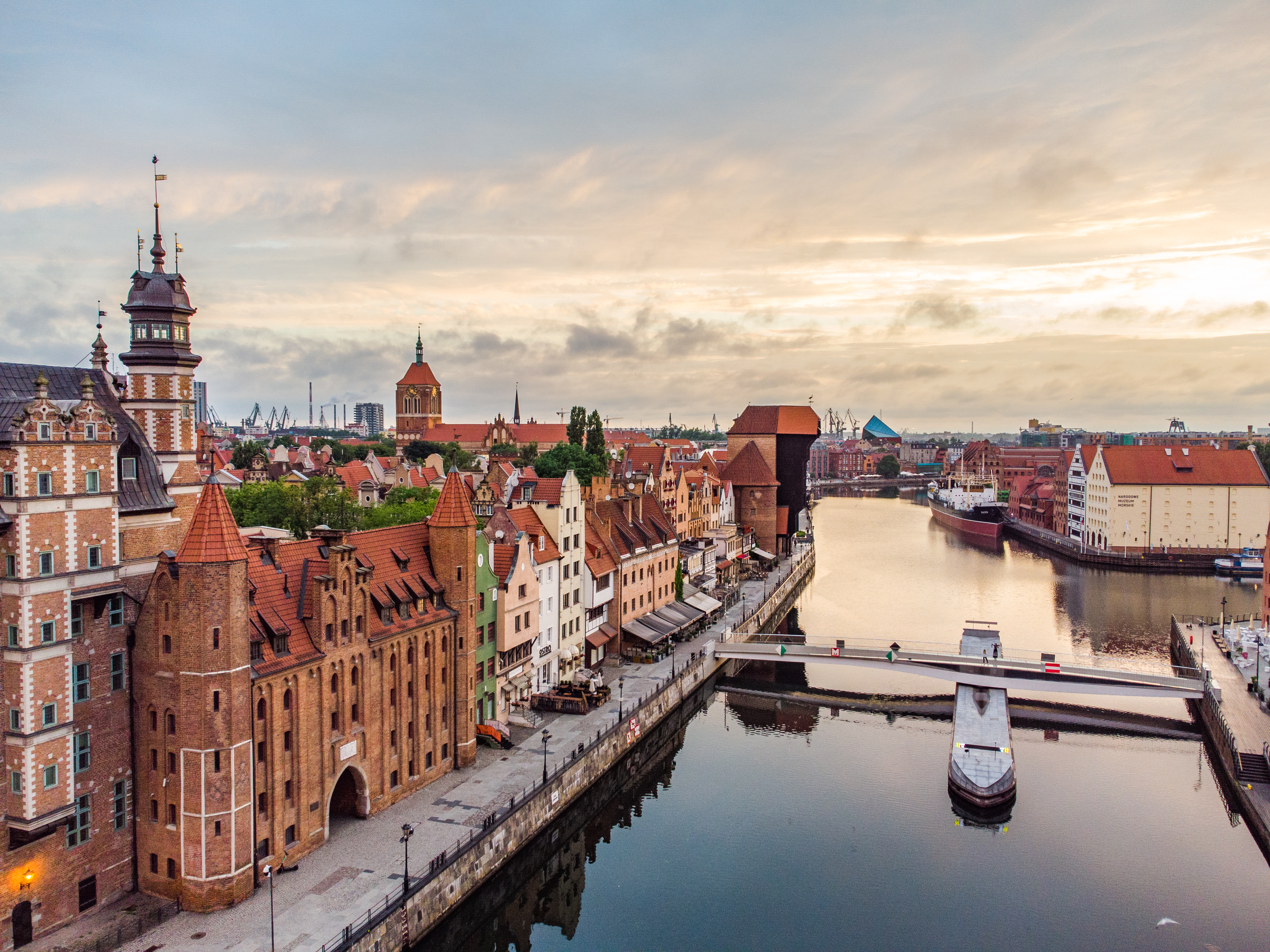
Gdańsk, Poland

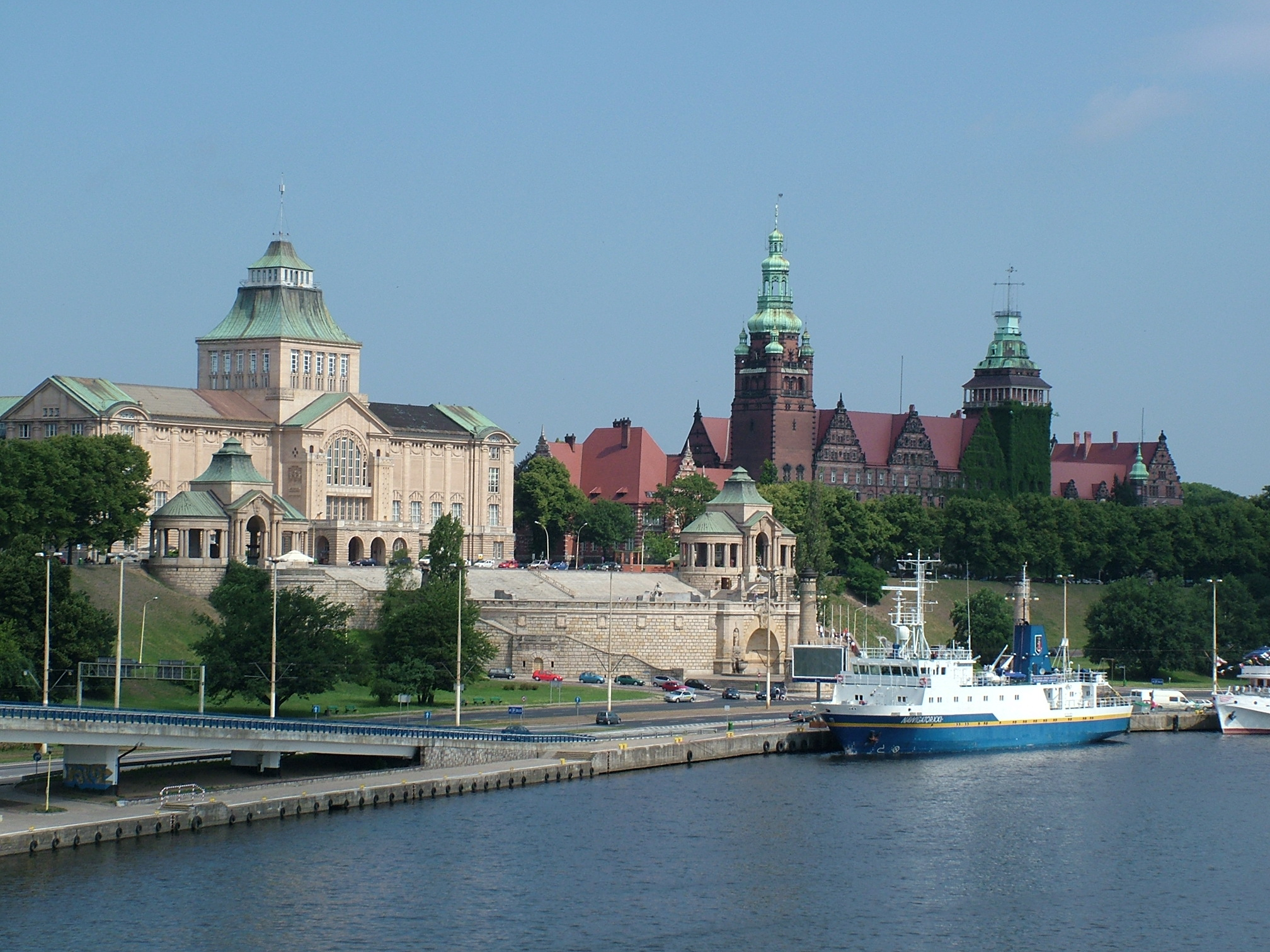
Szczecin, Poland

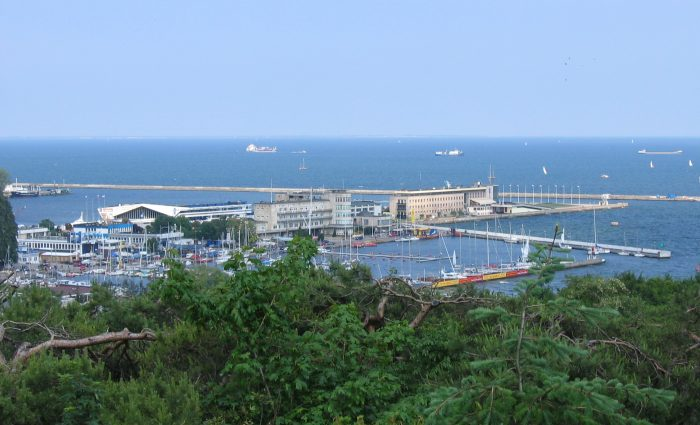
Marina in Gdynia, Poland

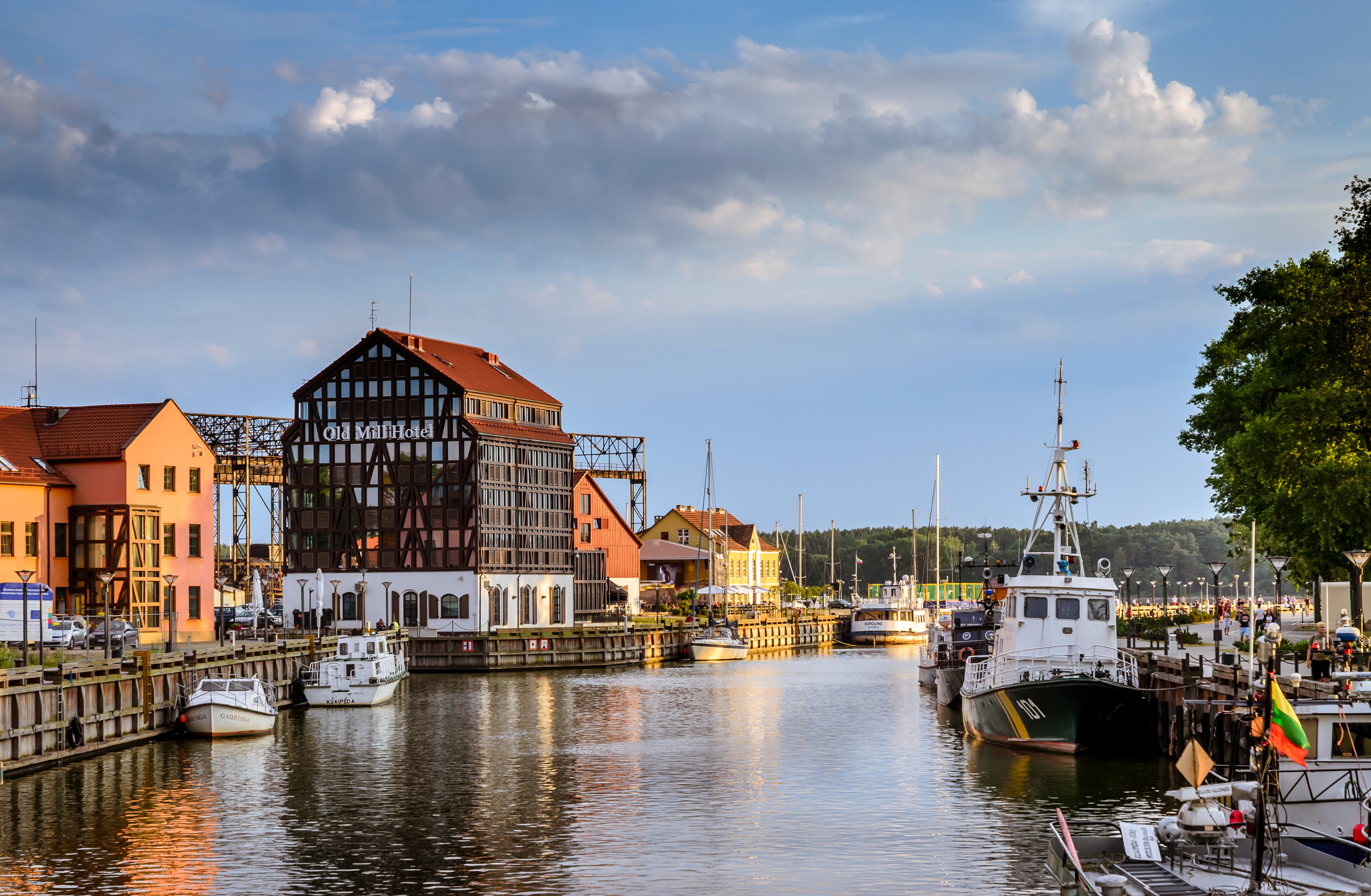
Klaipėda, Lithuania

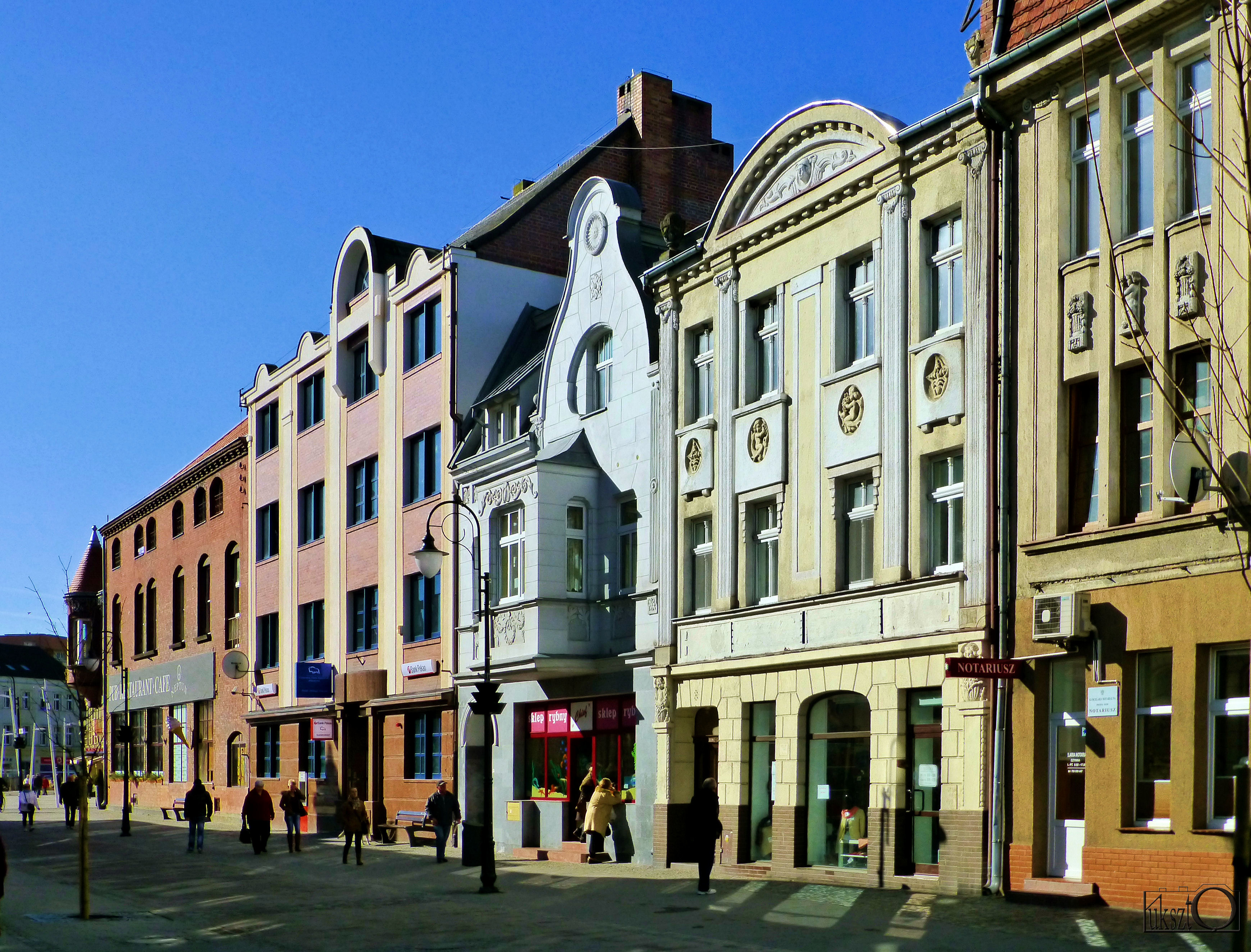
Świnoujście is a famous resort

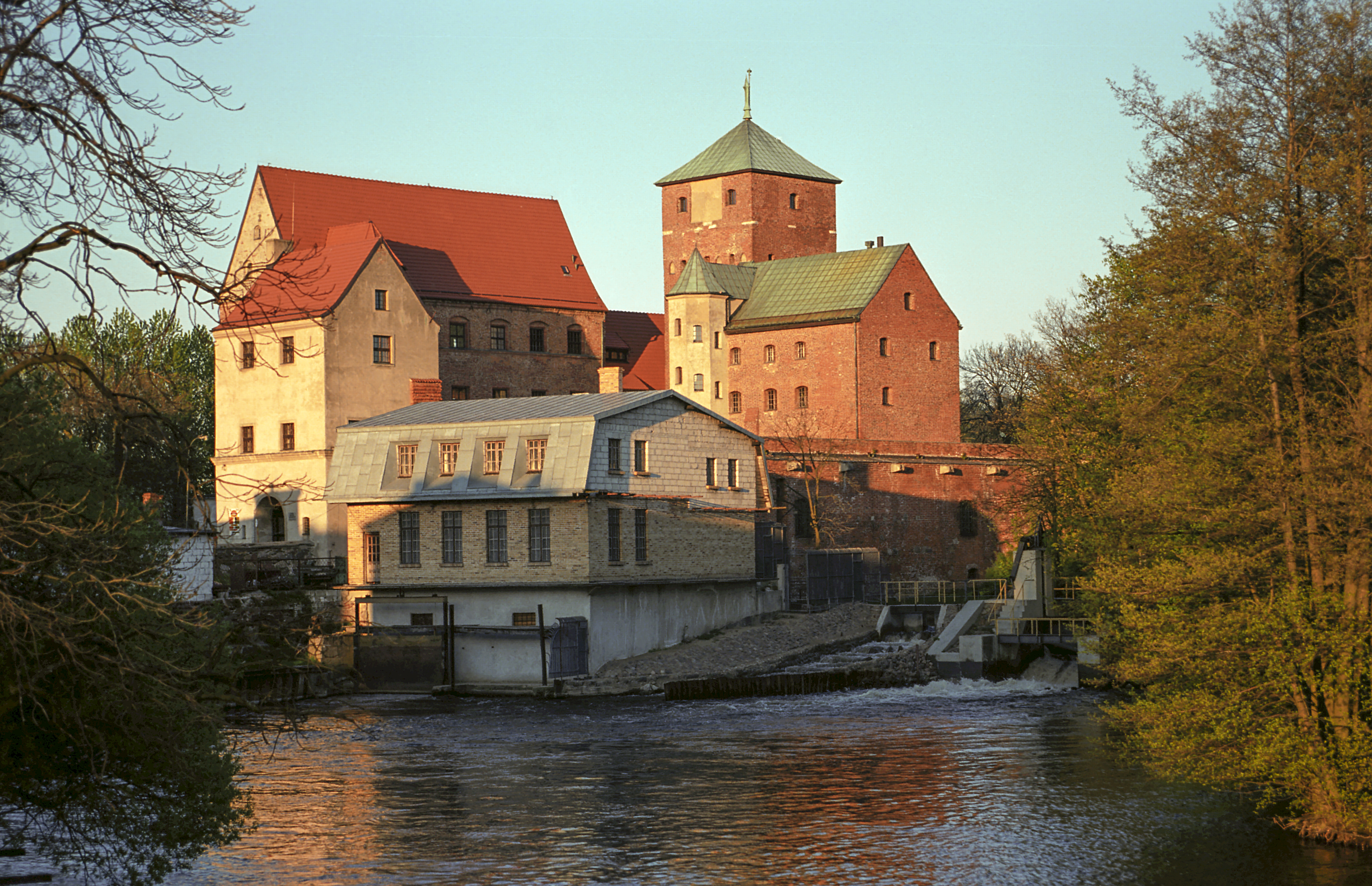
Darłowo, Poland

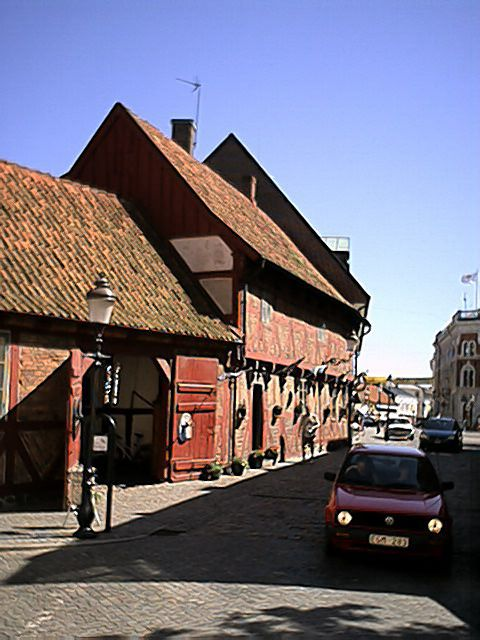
Ystad, Sweden

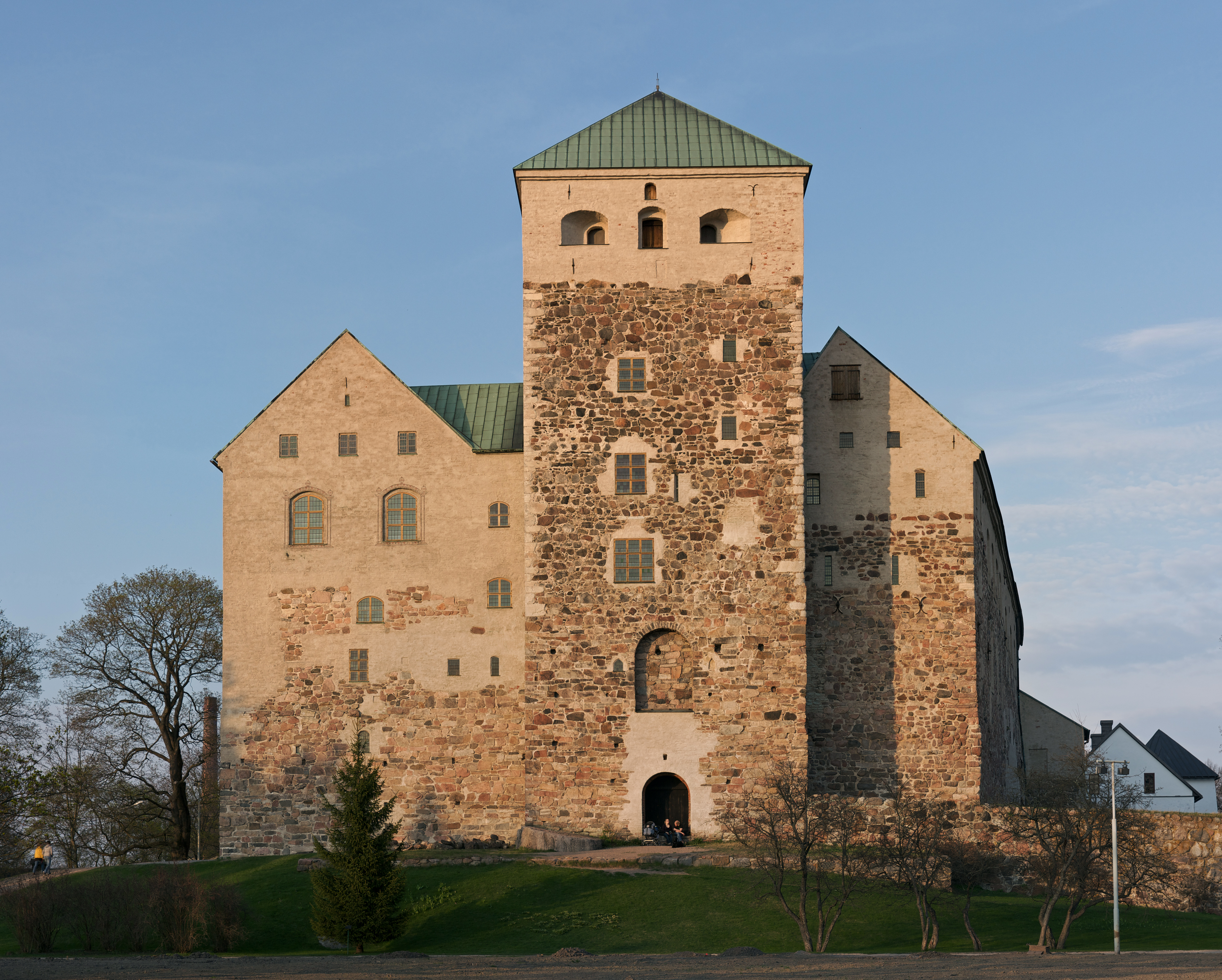
The medieval Turku Castle, Turku, Finland

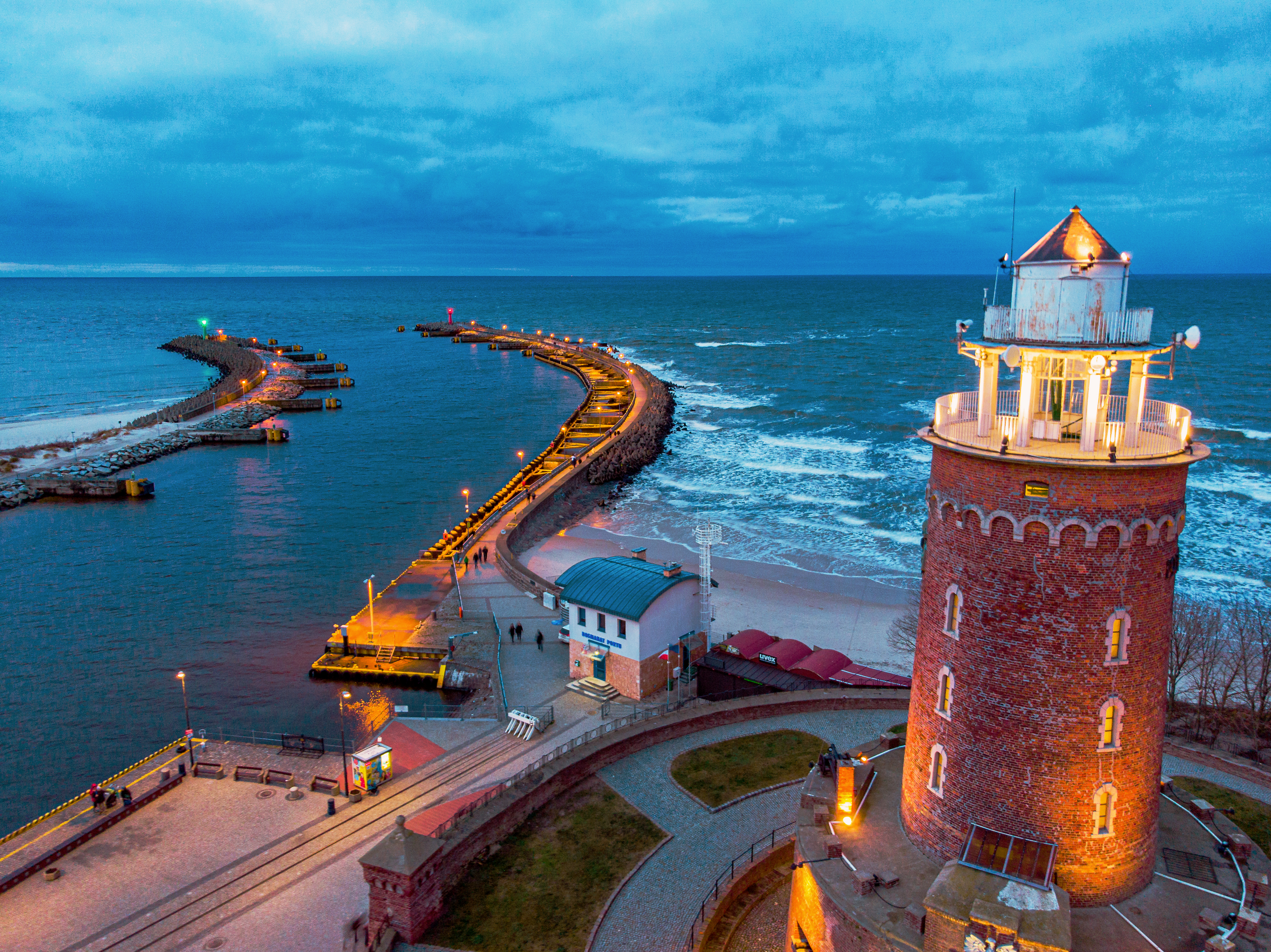
Lighthouse in Kołobrzeg, Poland

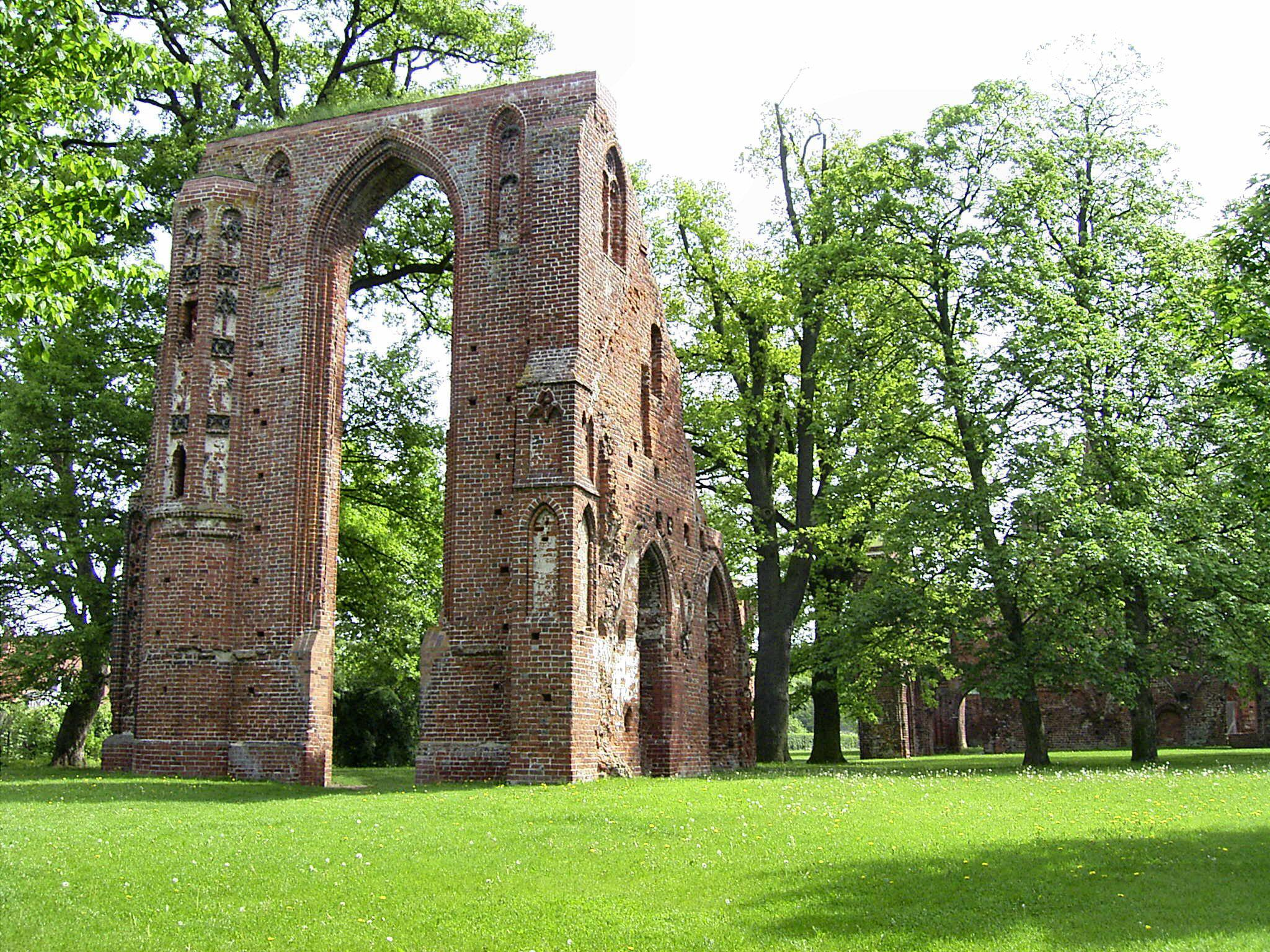
Eldena Abbey, Greifswald, Germany

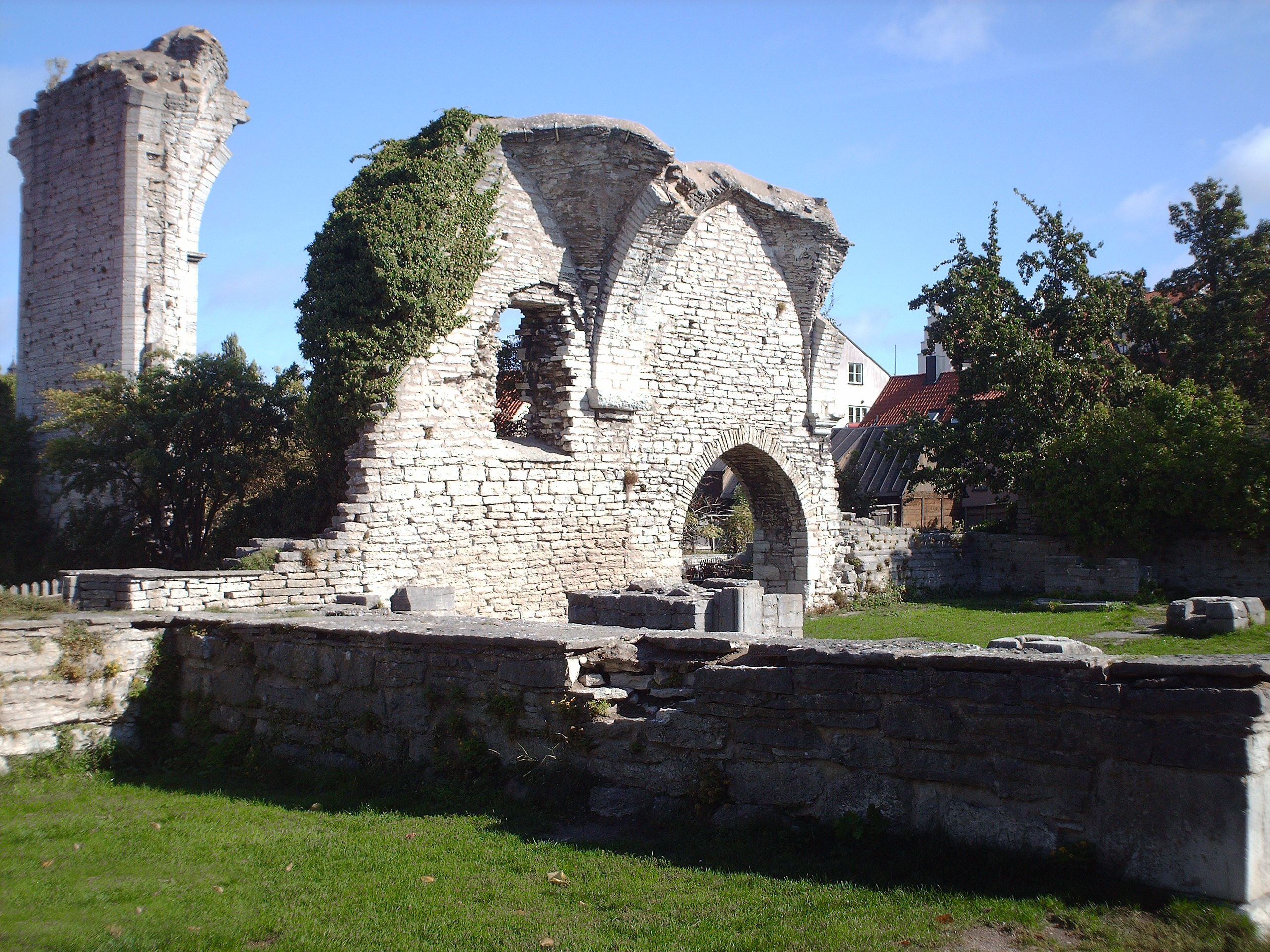
Ruin of St. Peter's and Hans's Church in Visby

This is a list of major cities and towns around the Baltic Sea, as well as some notable cities/towns with a small population. The census for Copenhagen, Helsinki and Stockholm includes the urban area.

City	Country	Founded	Population	Coordinates
Anklam	Germany	1296	12,635	53°51′N 13°41′E
Baltijsk	Russia	1725	32,697	54°39′N 19°55′E
Copenhagen	Denmark	1254	1,330,993	55°40′N 12°34′E
Darłowo	Poland	1312	14,931	54°25′N 16°25′E
Elbląg	Poland	1246	124,257	54°5′N 19°24′E
Flensburg	Germany	1284	87,432	54°46′N 09°26′E
Frombork	Poland	1310	2,415	54°21′N 19°41′E
Gdańsk	Poland	997	486,492	54°21′N 18°38′E
Gdynia	Poland	1926	242,141	54°30′N 18°32′E
Greifswald	Germany	1250	57,985	54°5′N 13°23′E
Gävle	Sweden	1446	75,451	60°40′N 16°10′E
Haapsalu	Estonia	1279	10,236	58°57′N 23°32′E
Hamina	Finland	1653	20,554	60°34′N 27°12′E
Hanko	Finland	1874	8,578	59°49′N 22°58′E
Helsingborg	Sweden	1085	142,793	56°03′N 12°43′E
Helsingør	Denmark	1420	61,519	56°02′N 13°37′E
Helsinki	Finland	1550	1,231,595	60°10′N 24°56′E
Härnösand	Sweden	1585	17,556	62°38′N 17°56′E
Jūrmala	Latvia	1959	52,154	56°58′N 23°45′E
Kaliningrad	Russia	1255	448,548	54°43′N 20°21′E
Kalajoki	Finland	1865 (city 2002)	12,533	64°16′N 23°57′E
Kalmar	Sweden	1100	36,392	56°40′N 16°22′E
Kamień Pomorski	Poland	1274	8,921	53°58′N 14°47′E
Kappeln	Germany	1375	8,676	54°39′N 9°55′E
Karlskrona	Sweden	1680	35,212	56°11′N 15°39′E
Kemi	Finland	1869	21,297	65°44′N 24°33′E
Kiel	Germany	1242	247,441	54°19′N 10°8′E
Klaipėda	Lithuania	1254	161,205	55°42′N 21°08′E
Køge	Denmark	1288	36,424	55°27′N 12°11′E
Kołobrzeg	Poland	1255	46,830	54°10′N 15°34′E
Kokkola	Finland	1620	47,722	60°53.2′N 23°08′E
Kotka	Finland	1878	53,730	60°28′N 26°56′E
Kronstadt	Russia	1704	43,005	60°00′N 29°46′E
Kuressaare	Estonia	1563	13,635	58°15′N 22°29′E
Kärdla	Estonia	1564	4,623	59°0′N 22°45′E
Łeba	Poland	1357	3,824	54°47′N 17°33′E
Liepāja	Latvia	1625	66,680	56°30′N 21°00′E
Loviisa	Finland	1745	15,140	60°27.5′N 26°14′E
Lübeck	Germany	1143	216,712	53°52′N 10°41′E
Luleå	Sweden	1621	76,770	65°36′N 22°09′E
Maardu	Estonia	1241	15,596	59°29′N 25°01′E
Malbork	Poland	1286	38,478	54°2′N 19°2′E
Malmö	Sweden	1353	341,457	55°35′N 13°02′E
Mariehamn	Finland	1861	11,658	60°05′N 19°56′E
Międzyzdroje	Poland	15th century	5,436	53°55′N 14°27′E
Naantali	Finland	1443	19,124	60°28′N 22°01′E
Narva-Jõesuu	Estonia	14th century	2,870	59°28′N 28°03′E
Neringa	Lithuania	1358 (Nida), 1429 (Juodkrantė)	4,712	55°18′N 21°00′E
Norrköping	Sweden	1384	137,326	58°36′N 16°12′E
Nowe Warpno	Poland	1352	1,170	53°43′N 14°17′E
Nyköping	Sweden	1444	29,891	58°45′N 17°00′E
Nykøbing Falster	Denmark	1150s	19,300	54°46′N 11°53′E
Oskarshamn	Sweden	1856	17,258	57°15′N 16°27′E
Oulu	Finland	1605	201,124	65°00′N 25°28′E
Palanga	Lithuania	1161 (1791)	18,835	56°56′N 24°06′E
Pori	Finland	1558	84,779	61°29′N 21°47′E
Porvoo	Finland	1380	50,203	60°23′N 25°39′E
Primorsk	Russia	1268	6,119	60°22′N 28°38′E
Pärnu	Estonia	1251	51,739	58°23′N 24°30′E
Raahe	Finland	1649	25,068	64°41′N 24°28′E
Rauma	Finland	1442	39,612	61°08′N 21°30′E
Riga	Latvia	1201	605,273	56°56′N 24°06′E
Rostock	Germany	1218	207,513	54°5′N 12°8′E
Rønne	Denmark	14th century	13,579	54°46′N 11°53′E
Saint Petersburg	Russia	1703	5,323,300	59°57′N 30°19′E
Sassnitz	Germany	1957 (1906)	9,485	54°31′N 13°38′E
Saulkrasti	Latvia	1823	3,341	57°15′N 24°25′E
Sestroretsk	Russia	1714	37,248	60°06′N 29°57′E
Sillamäe	Estonia	1502	13,666	59°24′N 27°45′E
Skellefteå	Sweden	1845	32,775	64°45′N 20°57′E
Słupsk	Poland	1265	93,706	54°27′N 17°1′E
Sopot	Poland	1901	37,089	54°26′N 18°33′E
Sosnovy Bor	Russia	1958	65,788	59°53′N 29°05′E
Stockholm	Sweden	1252	1,538,517	59°21′N 18°04′E
Stralsund	Germany	1234	59,101	54°18′N 13°5′E
Sundsvall	Sweden	1621	51,354	62°24′N 17°19′E
Szczecin	Poland	1243	391,566	53°25′N 14°33′E
Świnoujście	Poland	1765	41,516	53°55′N 14°15′E
Tallinn	Estonia	1154	457,572	59°26′N 24°44′E
Tornio	Finland	1621	21,939	65°50′N 24°08′E
Trzebiatów	Poland	1277	10,196	54°3′N 15°16′E
Turku	Finland	1229	188,584	60°27′N 22°16′E
Ueckermünde	Germany	1178	8,696	53°44′N 14°02′E
Umeå	Sweden	1622	121,032	63°50′N 20°15′E
Usedom	Germany	1292	1,810	53°52′N 13°55′E
Ustka	Poland	13th century	15,973	54°35′N 16°51′E
Uusikaupunki	Finland	1617	15,777	60°48′N 21°25′E
Vaasa	Finland	1606	66,876	63°05′N 21°36′E
Ventspils	Latvia	1378	32,634	57°23′N 21°33′E
Visby	Sweden	897	23,576	57°38′N 18°17′E
Vyborg	Russia	1293	79,962	59°57′N 30°19′E
Wismar	Germany	1229	42,557	53°54′N 11°28′E
Wolgast	Germany	1282	12,172	54°03′N 13°46′E
Wolin	Poland	1260	4,878	53°50′N 14°36′E
Ystad	Sweden	1244	28,985	55°25′N 13°50′E
Örnsköldsvik	Sweden	1842	32,107	63°17′N 18°42′E

== See also ==
- List of first-level administrative divisions of countries bordering the Baltic Sea
