= Coat of arms of Ustka =

The new rendering of the arms of Ustka in 2006. The mermaid now has fuller breasts, yet still lacks a navel.

The old rendering of the arms of Stolpmünde in 1922.

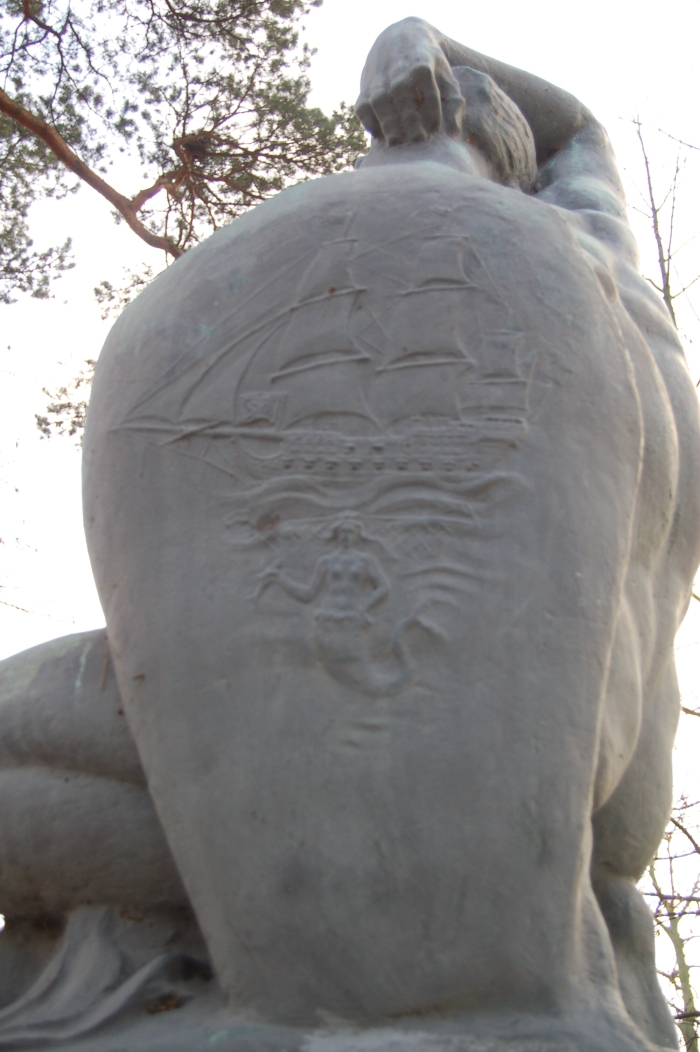
The arms on a local monument commemoration Stolpmünde war dead.

The original coat of arms of Ustka, Poland (German Stolpmünde) was created in 1922 by local artist Wilhelm Granzow.

The artist depicted the ship, mermaid and fish on the arms of his hometown of Stolpmünde, which symbolize the town's main sources of income: the seaport, tourism and fishery respectively. The coat of arms can be found in various places throughout the city, with the most remarkable of these being the 1922 monument by sculptor Josef Thorak named Der sterbende Krieger (The Dying Warrior) which commemorates the 76 inhabitants that perished during the First World War.

After the town became part of Poland the city arms of Stolpmünde were retained.

== Blazon ==
The official blazon (in Polish) of the arms of Ustka is:

W błękitnym polu tarczy żaglowiec trójmasztowy srebrny (z rozwiniętymi żaglami i o złotych pennantach na szczytach masztów), na falach o srebrnych grzywach. Poniżej, u podstawy tarczy, syrena ukoronowana złotą koroną, o złotych włosach i złotym (rybim) ogonie, z lewą ręką na biodrze, prawą – ujmująca dłonią rybę srebrną (łososia ).

The following is an unofficial English translation of the blazon:

Azure a sailing ship with three masts Argent, with pennants Or, on waves of the second; and in base a mermaid [proper] crowned, crined and tailed of the third, with her sinister hand on her hip and maintaining in her dexter hand a salmon of the second.

== Breasts affair ==
Ustka gained worldwide attention in the 2000s, as a bitter debate over a proposed alteration of the town's symbols started. In 2004, one of the town councilors proposed a modernization of the coat of arms. The temperature of a rather dull debate suddenly rose when one councilor complained, jokingly, about the current size and shape of mermaid's breasts, which, to her, seemed small and flaccid. For two years, the councilors debated the proper shape and size of breasts until they finally agreed to accept a project created by historian and heraldist Michał Marciniak-Kożuchowski. On the new coat of arms, the mermaid's breasts are significantly larger and more shapely. However, some councilors have complained that the new mermaid still lacks a navel.

Ustka's citizens were divided on the issue of enlarging the mermaid's breasts. Many of them supported the idea, stating that the change could increase tourism. Others, however, were dissatisfied with the idea of the cost of a reform that seemed entirely unnecessary. A small group of disgruntled citizens even began a petition, demanding that the mermaid be removed entirely from the town's coat of arms.

The whole affair provided a large dose of publicity to the town, making headlines in places as far afield as China. Also, the mermaid became Ustka's most recognizable symbol, and so has become a dominant theme of the town's promotional materials. The souvenir industry has acknowledged the potential of the mermaid and she is to be found on numerous trinkets and items in the town, often with enormous breasts.

== See also ==
- Bertizarana
