= Meteor (rocket) =

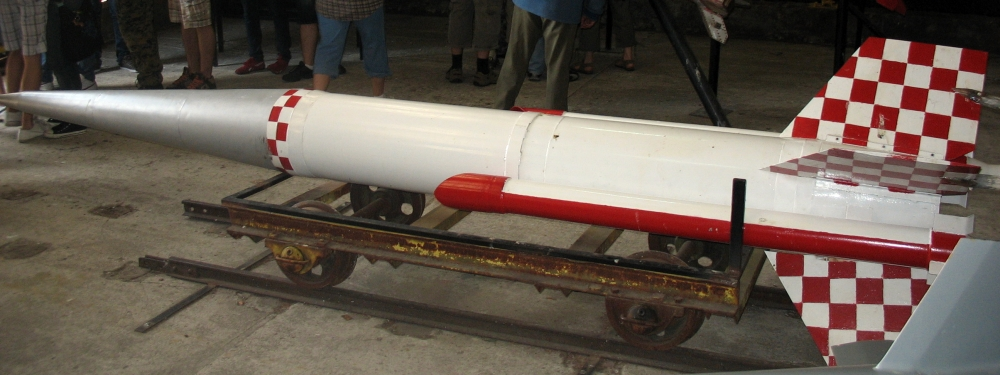
Reconstruction of Meteor 2 rocket in the Rocket Launcher Museum in Rąbka

Meteor is a family of Polish sounding rockets series. The Meteor rockets were built between 1963 and 1974.

Meteor was a series of one- and two-stage meteorological rockets using solid fuel, constructed for the research of the upper layers of the atmosphere, wind directions and forces from 18 km to more than 50 km above the Earth's surface. These rockets were designed by Polish engineers of Warsaw Aviation Institute (among them was Professor Jacek Walczewski and engineer Adam Obidziński) and had been produced by WZK-Mielec.

== History ==
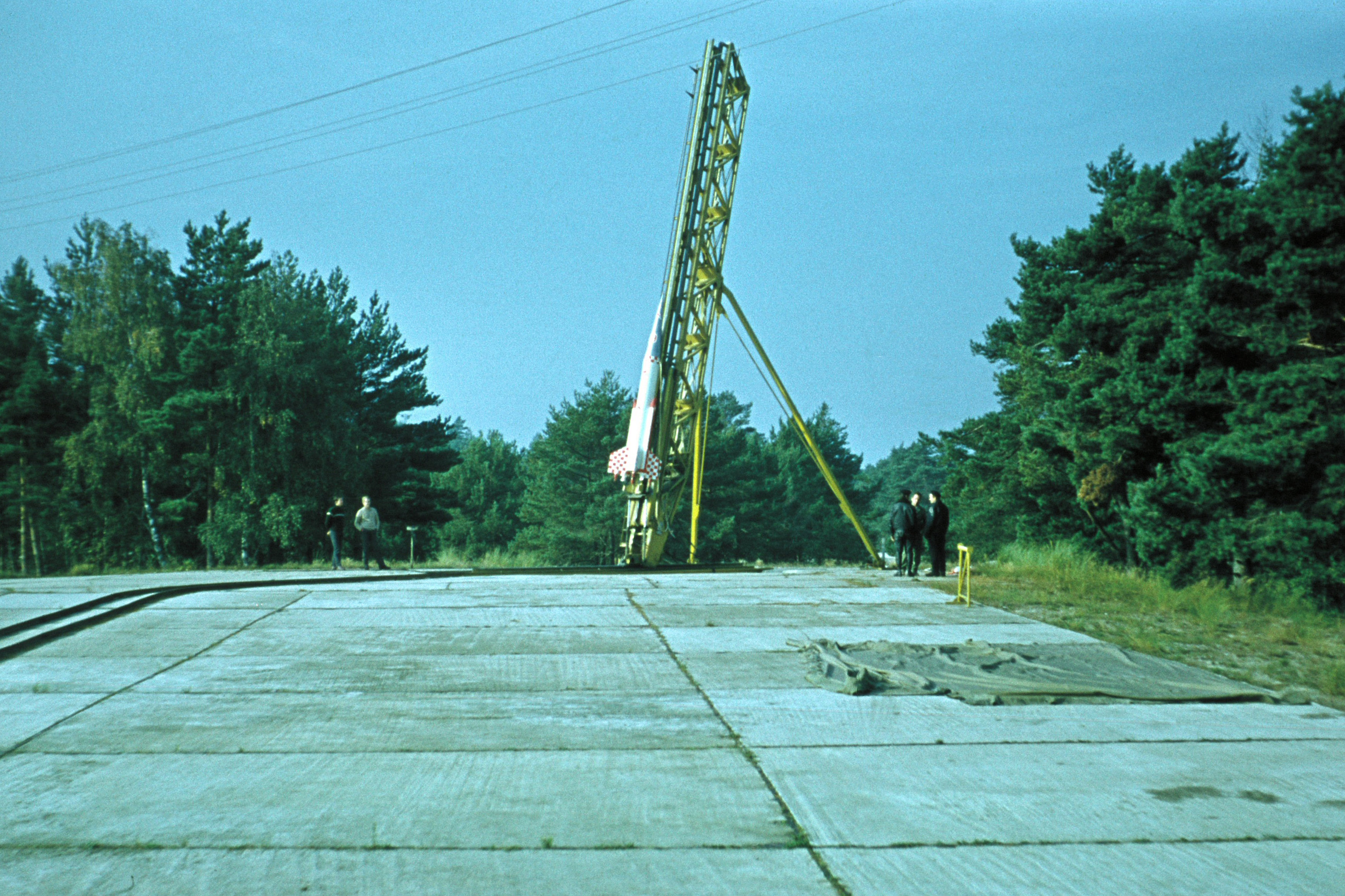
Meteor-2K rocket prepared launch, 7 October 1970

The first launch site of the sounding rockets in Poland was Błędowska Desert, where between 1958 and 1963, rockets of different types had been launched; among others RD and Rasko. During a flight, a biological experiment with earlier trained two white mouses was conducted (the RM-2D rocket achieved the altitude of 1,580 meters).

From 1965 until April 1970, the Meteor-1 rockets had been launched from a "spaceport" located 5 km from Ustka. This programme had been continued to 1974, when rockets were bearing out from the area of experimental center founded there during the years of the Second World War, located on west side of Łeba. Currently, it is preserved in the museum (the starting place with the ramp and the radar bases).

There were 224 flights of "Meteor-1" rocket series (including prototypes). The valuable data both meteorological and connected with rocket techniques were collected and analyzed as the result of these researches.

The "Meteor-1", "Meteor-2H" and "Meteor 2K" (the largest civilian rocket developed in Poland) were single-stage rockets. The "Meteor-3" was a two-stage rocket, developed from "Meteor 1".

	Meteor 1	Meteor 2H	Meteor 2K	Meteor 3
maximum altitude	40 km	68 km	100 km	65 km
takeoff thrust	14 kN	24 kN	52 kN	14 kN
diameter	12 cm	35 cm	35 cm	12 cm
length	2.5 m	4.5 m	4.3 m	4.3 m

Meteor rockets had been launched from Łeba and Ustka. Five Meteor rockets missions were conducted around 1970 from Zingst, in East Germany. The programme of flights of Meteor-2 was finished during the same year, when Poland started to participate in Interkosmos research, using the Vertical rockets, which were derived from R-14 missile.

== Meteor-1 ==
One stage, but two units rocket called "Meteor-1" had the length of 2,470 mm and the initial mass of 32.5 kg. The flight lasted for 80 seconds and reaching at the peak altitude of 36.5 km. The motor ignite for 2–3 seconds and reached the maximum velocity of 1,100 meters per seconds. In 1965, 6 rockets of "Meteor-1" type was launched and after this time: 12 in 1966, 40 in 1967, 45 in 1968, 36 in 1969, 34 in 1970 and 4 in 1971.

The charge of metal dipoles was released by rockets and this material had later been observed on radar screens. It was the base of derivation of winds strength in the stratosphere and winds directions in the same atmospheric layer. After experiments that had been conducted in the years 1965–1966, during "The Year of the Quiet Sun", a cyclic pattern of variation in case of directions of these atmospheric flows was concluded.

== Meteor-2 ==
The one stage "Meteor-2K" was the most advanced version of the Meteor rocket. On 7 October 1970, the flight took place and reached the altitude of 90 kilometers. This rocket had been used as sounding of the ionosphere, reaching the level of boundary between D and E layers. 10 more flights of this version were realized, when the measurements of temperature were made. The length of rocket frame is 4.5 meters and some are more longer than an English rocket, Petrel (in service since 1968). The "Meteor-2" had not been produced in serial way. The cost of this rocket prototype was eight times higher than for the copy of "Meteor-1". The weight of useful charge, in form of "RAMZES" recovery probe, is 10 kg.

== Meteor-3 ==
A two-stage rocket called "Meteor-3" was a developed version of "Meteor-1". The range of flight was increased and the rocket gained possibility of launching of few charges of dipoles. It can reach at ceiling altitudes between 67 and 74 kilometers. An idea of version "S" project had been considered, although never realized. This model could be launch from airplane frame, about 5 kilometers above the surface.

== Meteor-4 ==
"Meteor-4" rocket has ten times more thrust than "Meteor-2". This version could reach above 100 km. According to design, this rocket is longer than 5 meters and had the initial total mass of 407 kg with useful weight of 10 kg. 175 seconds into the flight, it would reach at the altitude of 120 kilometers.

== Launch Log ==
Number	Date	Launch site	Maximum altitude (kilometres)	Rocket type	Remarks
1	1963	Leba	36	Meteor 1	Test flight
2	April 1965	Leba	36	Meteor 1	Aeronomy mission
3	June 15, 1965	Leba	?	Meteor 1	Aeronomy mission
4	June 15, 1965	Leba	?	Meteor 1	Aeronomy mission
5	June 16, 1965	Leba	36	Meteor 1	Aeronomy mission
6	April 5, 1967	Leba	36	Meteor 1	Aeronomy mission
7	April 5, 1967	Leba	?	Meteor 1	Aeronomy mission
8	May 13, 1967	Leba	36	Meteor 1	Aeronomy mission
9	1968	Leba	68	Meteor 2H	Test flight
10	1968?	Leba	68	Meteor 2H	Test flight
11	October 1968	Leba	65	Meteor 3	Aeronomy mission
12	1969?	Leba	68	Meteor 2H	Aeronomy mission
13	1969?	Leba	68	Meteor 2H	Aeronomy mission
14	1969?	Leba	68	Meteor 2H	Aeronomy mission
15	October 3, 1969	Leba	48	Meteor 3	Aeronomy mission
16	October 3, 1969	Leba	49	Meteor 3	Aeronomy mission
17	October 3, 1969	Leba	45	Meteor 3	Aeronomy mission
18	1970?	Leba	68	Meteor 2H	Test flight
19	July 10, 1970	Leba	85	Meteor 2K	Aeronomy mission
20	July 10, 1970	Leba	100	Meteor 2K	Test flight
21	August 22, 1970	Leba	57	Meteor 3	Aeronomy mission
22	September 2, 1970	Leba	63	Meteor 3	Aeronomy mission
23	September 7, 1970	Leba	62	Meteor 3	Aeronomy mission
24	September 9, 1970	Leba	61	Meteor 3	Aeronomy mission
25	October 7, 1970	Leba	75	Meteor 2K	Aeronomy mission
26	October 7, 1970	Leba	89	Meteor 2K	Aeronomy mission
27	June 11, 1973	Leba	22	Meteor 1	Aeronomy mission
28	June 12, 1973	Leba	23	Meteor 1	Aeronomy mission
29	June 14, 1973	Leba	40	Meteor 3	Aeronomy mission
30	June 15, 1973	Leba	22	Meteor 3	Aeronomy mission
31	June 15, 1973	Leba	40	Meteor 1	Aeronomy mission
32	September 15, 1973	Leba	36	Meteor 1	Aeronomy mission
33	September 16, 1973	Leba	44	Meteor 3	Aeronomy mission
34	September 17, 1973	Leba	45	Meteor 3	Aeronomy mission
35	September 18, 1973	Leba	44	Meteor 3	Aeronomy mission
36	June 6, 1974	Leba	65	Meteor 3	Aeronomy mission
