= Adam Obidziński =

Polish engineer and scientist, and co-founder of Meteor project

- Born: 23 December 1929; Warsaw, Poland
- Died: 21 August 1985 (aged 55); Warsaw, Poland
- Occupations: Scientist, Engineer

Adam Obidziński (born 23 December 1929 in Warsaw, Poland; died 21 August 1985 in Warsaw, Poland) was a Polish engineer and scientist, and co-founder of Meteor project.

Born in the noble family bearing Dąbrowa coat of arms, graduate of Warsaw School of Technology. Awarded many times for his work on the Meteor project and held an invention patent for innovative, and widely used "rescue line delivery rocket system".

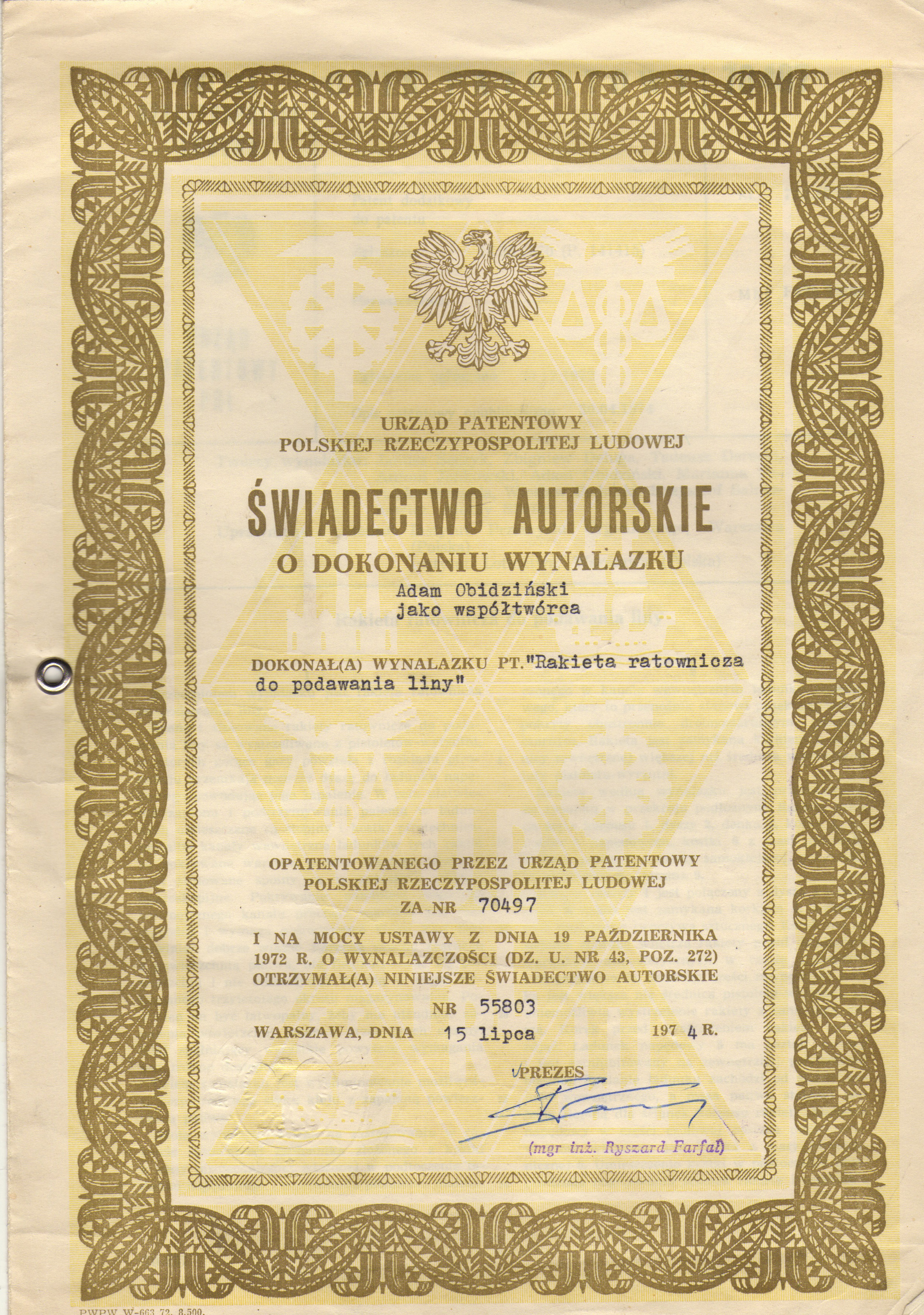
Świadectwo autorskie Adam Obidziński

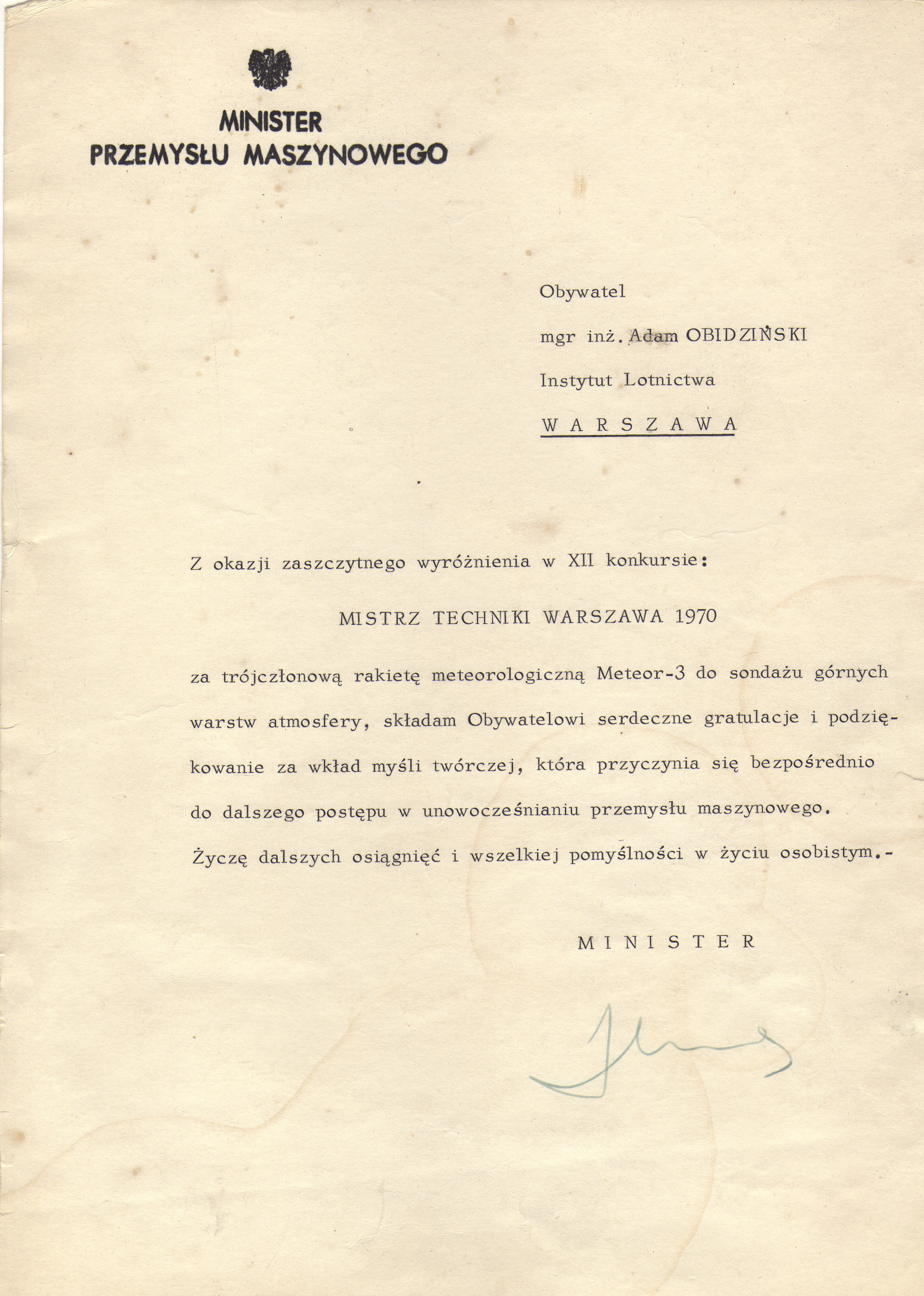
Adam Obidziński Mistrz Techniki Warszawa 1970 Meteor-3

== Awards ==
- Knight's Cross of the Order of Polonia Restituta
- Bronze Medal of Merit for National Defence
- 1974: Medal of the 30th Anniversary of People's Poland
