= Ustka =

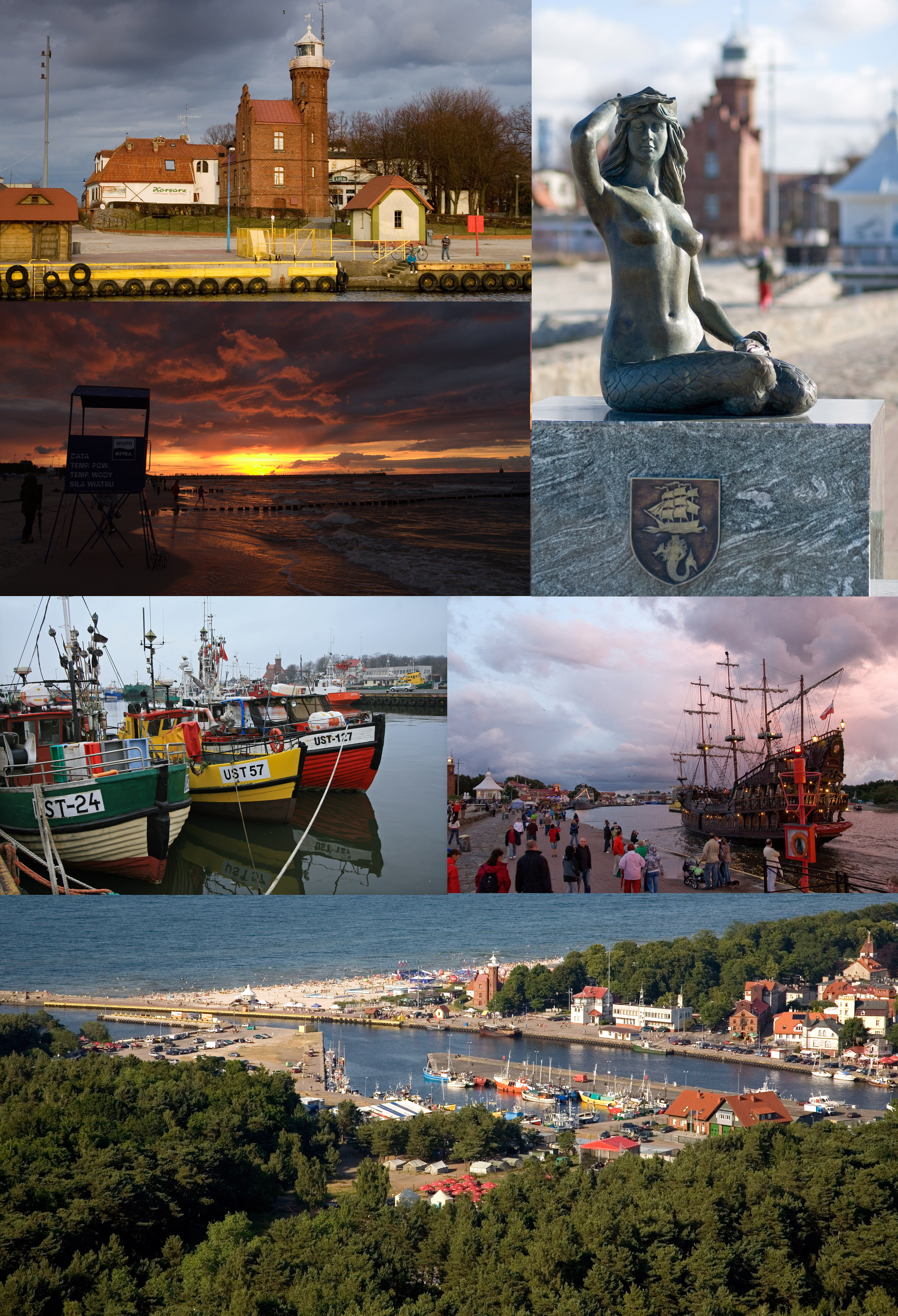
- Collage of views of Ustka: lighthouse, beach in Ustka, mermaid, boats in the port, the entrance to the port, the port in Ustka bird's eye view

- Flag Coat of arms

- Location within Poland
- Coordinates: 54°35′N 16°51′E
- Country: Poland
- Voivodeship: Pomeranian
- County: Słupsk
- Gmina: Ustka (urban gmina)
- Established: thirteenth century
- Town rights: 1935

Government
  - Mayor: Jacek Maniszewski

Area
  - Total: 10.14 km^{2} (3.92 sq mi)
- Elevation: 3 m (9.8 ft)

Population (2015)
  - Total: 15,973
  - Density: 1,575/km^{2} (4,080/sq mi)
- Time zone: UTC+1 (CET)
  - Summer (DST): UTC+2 (CEST)
- Postal code: 76-270
- Area code: +48 59
- Car plates: GSL
- Website: http://www.ustka.pl

Ustka (Polish pronunciation: [ˈustka], Kashubian: Ùskô, German: Stolpmünde) is a spa town in the Middle Pomerania region of northern Poland with 17,100 inhabitants (2001). It is part of Słupsk County in Pomeranian Voivodeship. It is located on the Slovincian Coast on the Baltic Sea. It is a port town and popular summer seaside resort of Poland.

== History ==
The first settlers arrived at present-day Ustka as early as the 9th century, and established a fishing settlement with the original name of Ujść. In the 10th century, it became part of the emerging country of Poland under its first ruler Mieszko I. The first historic records mention the village under the names of Ujść or Ujście in 1310.

The area at the mouth of the river Słupia was ceded to the nearby city of Słupsk in 1337 with the purpose of building a fishing harbour and a commercial port there to the Baltic Sea. According to documents in 1355 a church was built. In 1382 the city of Słupsk (German: Stolp) became a member of the Hanseatic League. The settlement was located in the Duchy of Słupsk, a vassal duchy of the Kingdom of Poland, and later it passed to the Duchy of Pomerania.

The town was given to Brandenburg-Prussia following the partition of the Duchy of Pomerania after the Treaty of Westphalia in 1648, and from the 18th century it formed part of the Kingdom of Prussia. On August 1, 1778, a blaze destroyed 18 houses which, however, were soon re-built. In 1871, the town became part of the German Empire. The first railway station was opened in 1878. The rails were transported by the sea and the bedding for the track was formed by sand taken from the dunes on the Western Beach. The first passenger train departed on 1 October 1878. The rail was also used as a main transport facilitating the trade from the harbour. The rail track was extended to run into the harbour, trading mostly grain and spirits. Records state that in 1887, the local harbour shipped 5 million litres of plain spirits. The Harbour lost its importance after World War II, as fishing began to take priority over trade. The current shape of the harbour is a result of an investment between 1899 and 1903 creating the largest port between Stettin (Szczecin) and Danzig (Gdańsk).

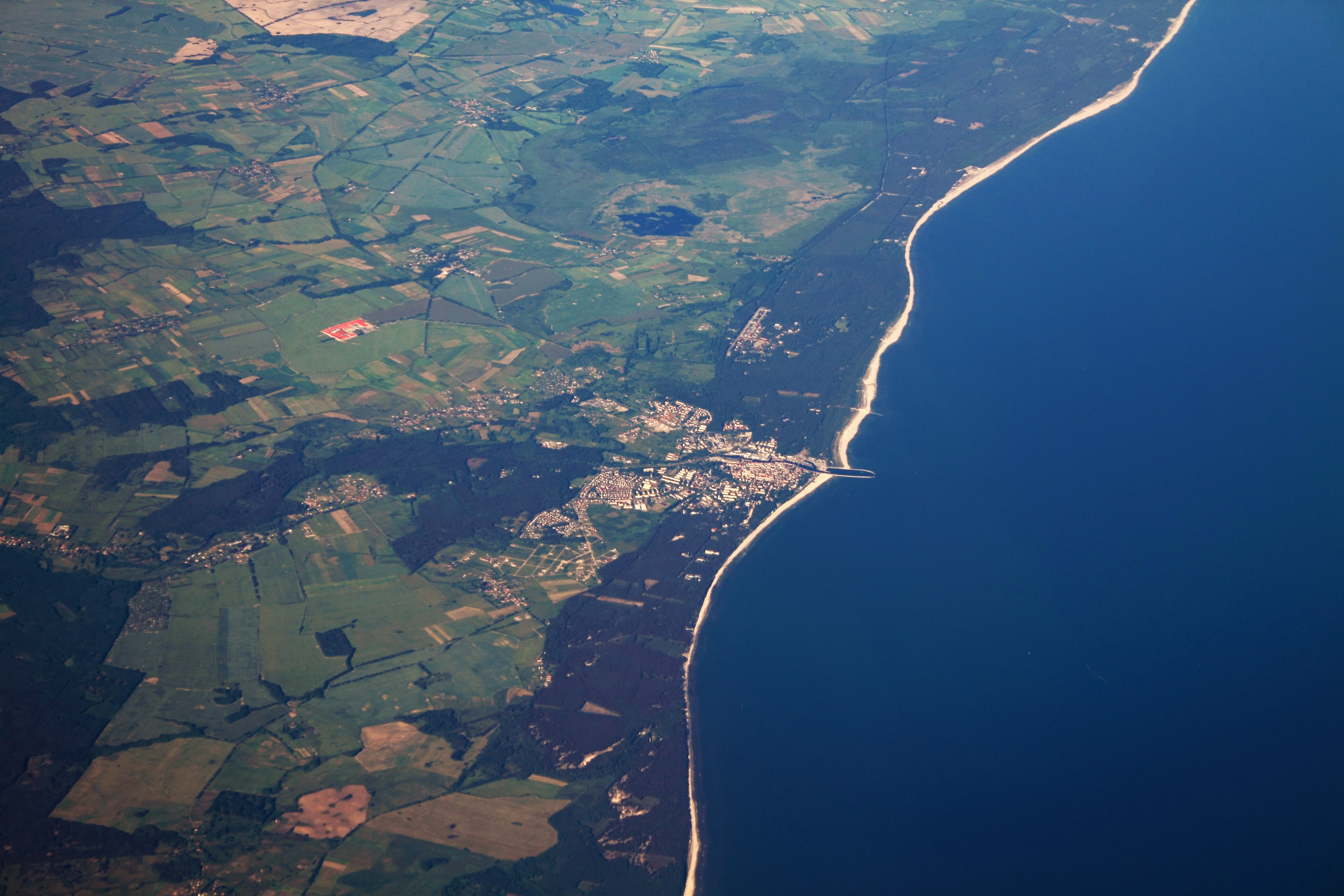
Ustka as seen from a plane

The restoration of independent Poland and creation of the so-called Polish Corridor at the end of World War I separated the German exclave of East Prussia from the German Province of Pomerania. As a result, the German Ministry for Transport established a ferry connection to East Prussia ("Sea Service East Prussia" or Seedienst Ostpreußen) in 1922, independent of the transit through Poland. These ships also harboured in Stolpmünde. Because of the increasing traffic it was planned for the harbour to be enlarged and modernized. The gigantic new development kicked off at the beginning of 1938. A third pier was started as docking station for the largest vessels. The construction of the new port was halted on 23 September 1939 after the German Invasion of Poland. During World War II, the German administration operated a forced labour subcamp of the Stalag II-B prisoner-of-war camp for Allied POWs.

The old part of the town has retained its layout since the Middle Ages. The small residential buildings were modernised in the 1830s, however the layout of the streets was not changed. Since 2005, Ustka's authorities and the European Union embarked on the Revitalisation Programme for Old Ustka. Many buildings have and are being restored.

Monuments in the town include a lighthouse from 1871 (rebuilt to include the octagonal tower in 1892), Main Post Office from 1875 and church from 1882.

After World War II, the new Polish authorities took steps to determine an official name to replace the German 'Stolpmünde'. Ujść, Uszcz, and Ustka were all posted on the main railway station in 1945; Nowy Słupsk was the name on the sign at the main Post Office; Postomino was the town's name at the town hall; and Słupioujście was posted at the Harbour Master's office. The final name, Ustka, was decided upon in the late 1940s.

From 1975 to 1998, it was administratively located in the Słupsk Voivodeship.

== Tourism ==
Ustka is a popular tourist destination and a fishing port on the south coasts of the Baltic. For a number of years, following the political changes in Poland, the town has won a string of local awards for the best summer place in the country. After the collapse of the Ustka Shipyard, the only shipyard in Poland to have manufactured fire-proof lifeboats, and a number of fish processing enterprises, the local authorities put tourism as a primary source of income for the town. Since the end of the 19th century, Ustka has been recognised as a summer holiday resort and various illnesses treatment and recovery centre.

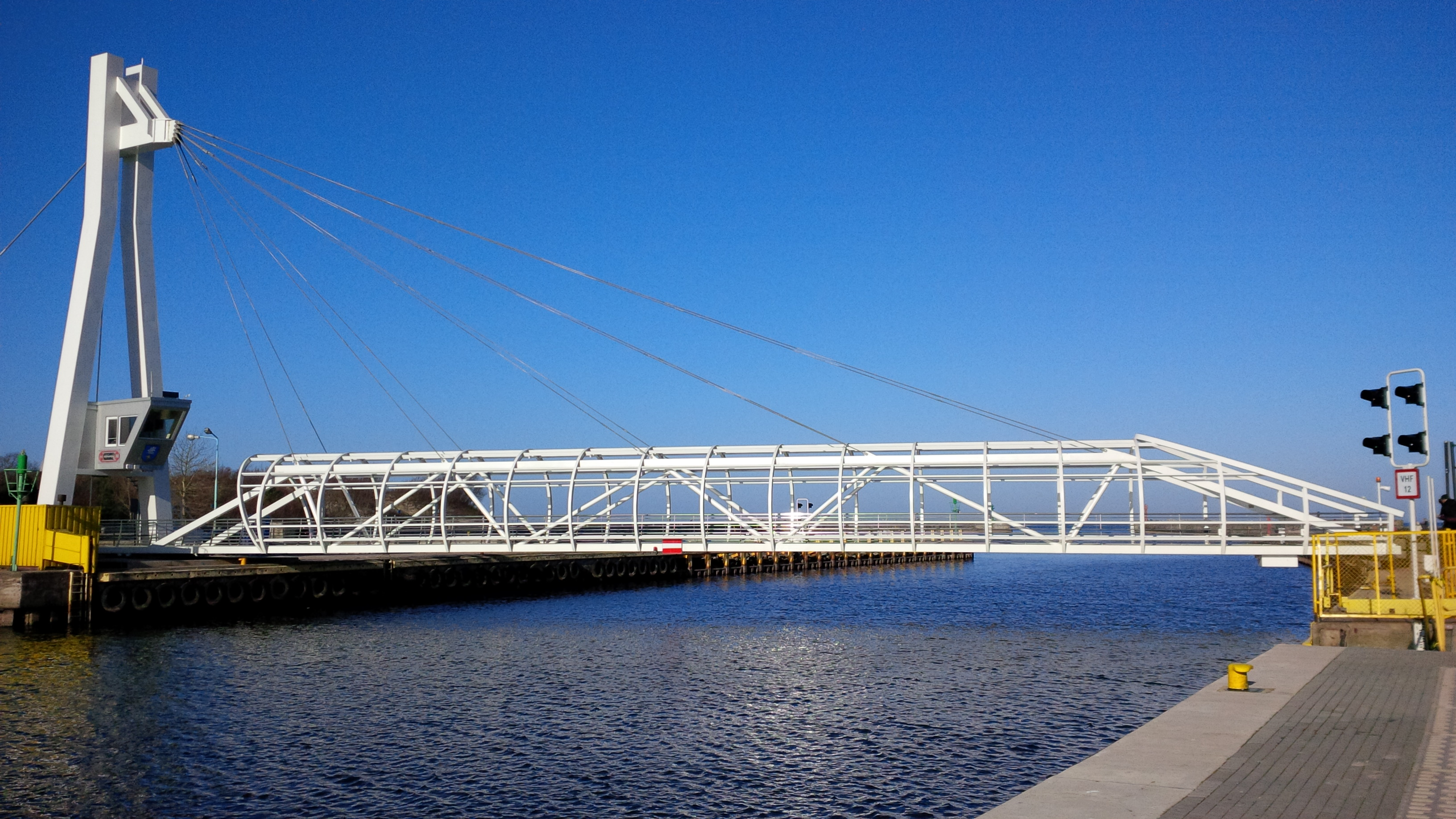
Pedestrian swing bridge in Ustka

There are two beaches in Ustka. The Eastern Beach and the Western Beach, divided by the river Słupia. Since the eastern part of the town contains the centre, the Eastern Beach is more popular than the Western Beach. The Western Beach runs into the territory of the Navy Training Centre (CSSMW, Centrum Szkolenia Specjalistów Marynarki Wojennej), access to which was restricted beyond a certain point in the west. However, much more popular, developed and facilitated with numerous bars, restaurants, a concert hall, and a waterfront promenade (built in 1875), the Eastern Beach is more prone to "abrasia" (the erosion of the sea). The maintenance of the beach, which after the winter storm season becomes very narrow, is one of the considerable expenses of Ustka authorities. The Eastern Beach has high sand cliffs. The Western Beach is flat.

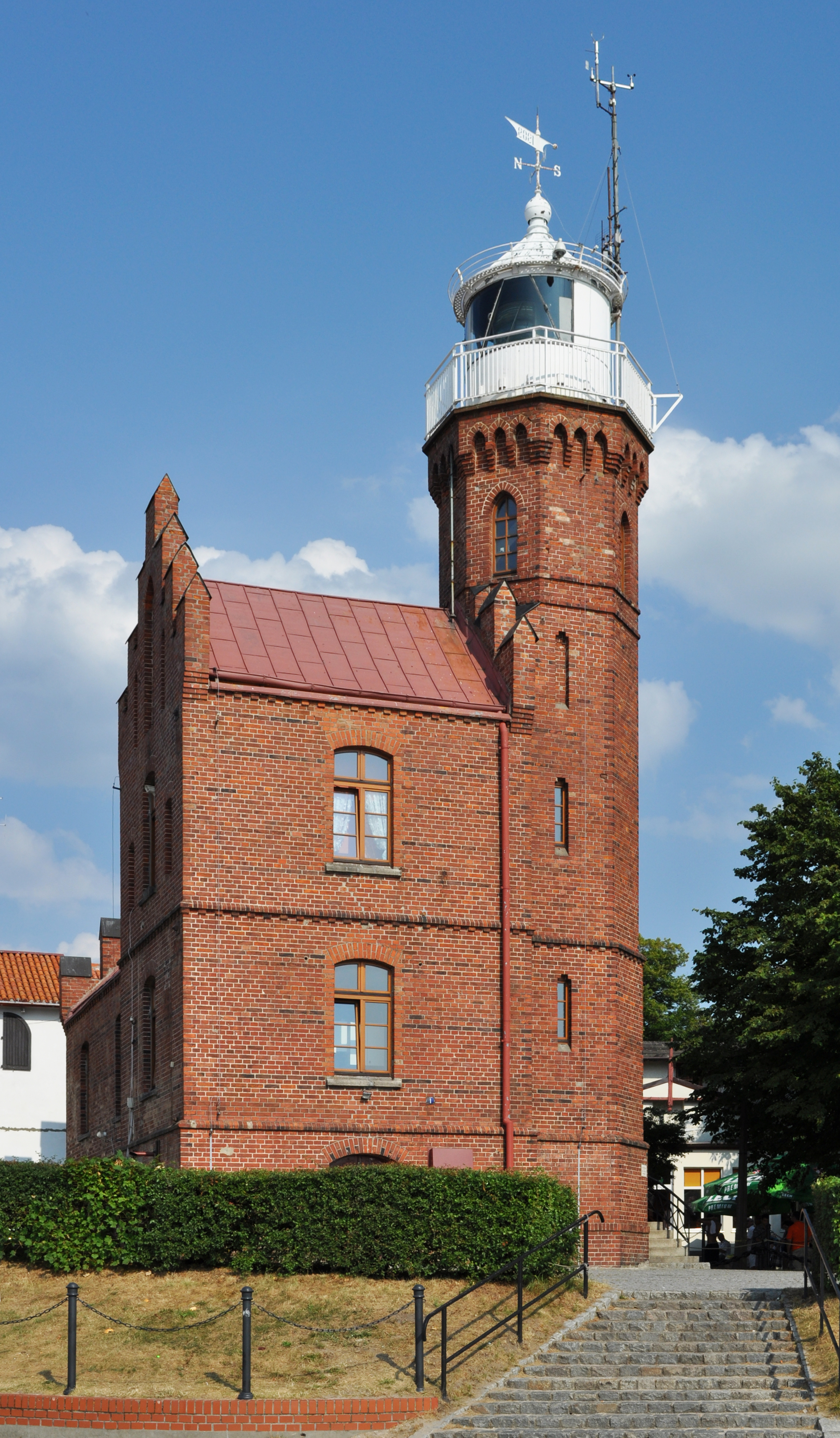
Ustka Lighthouse

There is a new (built in 2013), swing pedestrian bridge over the river Słupia - open for 20 minutes every hour, that links both beaches every day. Road-rail bridge in Ustka is located outside the centre, in the western part of the town - close to the main railway station.

Near Ustka is a military exercise area from which Meteor-type sounding rockets were launched in the late 1960s and early 1970s.

Ustka is also a host of the annual International Contest of Fireworks, which takes place in the middle of July.

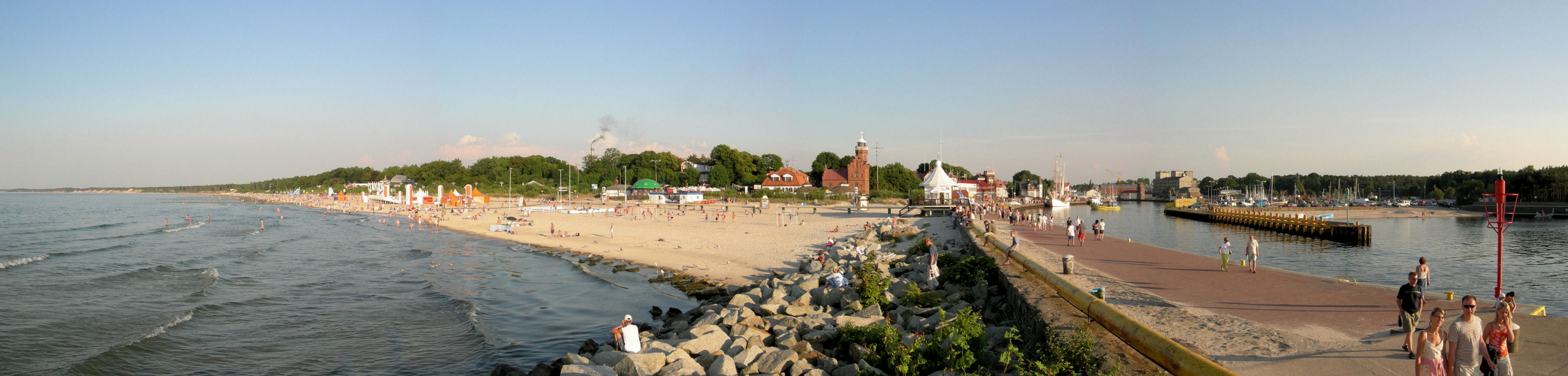
Panoramic view of beach and port in Ustka seen from pier

== Climate ==
Ustka has an oceanic climate (Köppen climate classification: Cfb).

Climate data for Ustka (1991–2020 normals, extremes 1951–present)
Month	Jan	Feb	Mar	Apr	May	Jun	Jul	Aug	Sep	Oct	Nov	Dec	Year
Record high °C (°F)	13.8 (56.8)	17.8 (64.0)	22.5 (72.5)	29.4 (84.9)	32.1 (89.8)	34.8 (94.6)	35.1 (95.2)	37.8 (100.0)	33.2 (91.8)	28.0 (82.4)	20.0 (68.0)	13.8 (56.8)	37.8 (100.0)
Mean maximum °C (°F)	8.9 (48.0)	9.9 (49.8)	15.1 (59.2)	22.3 (72.1)	26.3 (79.3)	28.6 (83.5)	29.9 (85.8)	30.1 (86.2)	25.3 (77.5)	19.2 (66.6)	13.1 (55.6)	9.4 (48.9)	32.0 (89.6)
Mean daily maximum °C (°F)	2.8 (37.0)	3.5 (38.3)	6.2 (43.2)	11.0 (51.8)	15.1 (59.2)	18.9 (66.0)	21.5 (70.7)	21.9 (71.4)	18.1 (64.6)	12.9 (55.2)	7.5 (45.5)	4.0 (39.2)	12.0 (53.6)
Daily mean °C (°F)	0.7 (33.3)	1.1 (34.0)	3.1 (37.6)	7.1 (44.8)	11.2 (52.2)	15.1 (59.2)	17.8 (64.0)	18.0 (64.4)	14.4 (57.9)	9.8 (49.6)	5.3 (41.5)	2.1 (35.8)	8.8 (47.8)
Mean daily minimum °C (°F)	−1.4 (29.5)	−1.1 (30.0)	0.7 (33.3)	4.1 (39.4)	8.0 (46.4)	11.8 (53.2)	14.5 (58.1)	14.6 (58.3)	11.4 (52.5)	7.2 (45.0)	3.3 (37.9)	0.1 (32.2)	6.1 (43.0)
Mean minimum °C (°F)	−10.6 (12.9)	−8.3 (17.1)	−5.4 (22.3)	−1.3 (29.7)	2.1 (35.8)	7.0 (44.6)	10.3 (50.5)	10.0 (50.0)	5.7 (42.3)	0.8 (33.4)	−3.0 (26.6)	−7.1 (19.2)	−13.2 (8.2)
Record low °C (°F)	−23.1 (−9.6)	−26.6 (−15.9)	−15.7 (3.7)	−6.2 (20.8)	−2.9 (26.8)	−0.4 (31.3)	4.5 (40.1)	4.4 (39.9)	−0.5 (31.1)	−6.6 (20.1)	−12.8 (9.0)	−18.9 (−2.0)	−26.6 (−15.9)
Average precipitation mm (inches)	43.9 (1.73)	37.0 (1.46)	39.0 (1.54)	26.6 (1.05)	43.8 (1.72)	55.9 (2.20)	74.9 (2.95)	85.7 (3.37)	74.7 (2.94)	75.7 (2.98)	57.1 (2.25)	52.6 (2.07)	666.8 (26.25)
Average extreme snow depth cm (inches)	5.1 (2.0)	5.7 (2.2)	3.8 (1.5)	0.3 (0.1)	0.0 (0.0)	0.0 (0.0)	0.0 (0.0)	0.0 (0.0)	0.0 (0.0)	0.2 (0.1)	1.2 (0.5)	4.3 (1.7)	5.7 (2.2)
Average precipitation days (≥ 0.1 mm)	17.63	16.00	14.53	10.60	11.40	12.17	13.70	14.60	14.27	15.67	17.43	18.97	176.97
Average snowy days (≥ 0 cm)	10.1	11.1	4.9	0.3	0.0	0.0	0.0	0.0	0.0	0.1	1.6	6.0	34.1
Source 1: Institute of Meteorology and Water Management
Source 2: Meteomodel.pl (records)

== Demographics ==
Since the medieval Christianization of the region, the local population was Catholic. After the Reformation, most inhabitants of the town were Protestants. The Germans fled or were expelled during and after World War II. As a result, the current population is once again composed predominantly of Roman Catholics.

Number of inhabitants in years
Year	Inhabitants
1905	2,374
1933	4,014
1939	4,739
1960	6,100
1970	9,000
1975	12,400
1980	15,200
2001	17,100
2015	15,973

== Sports ==
The local football team is Jantar Ustka. It competes in the lower leagues.

== Notable people ==
- Kazimierz Adach (born 1957), boxer, Olympic medalist
- Barbara Madejczyk (born 1976), javelin thrower
- Michael Dembek (born 1991), President Canadian Polish Congress

== Twin towns – sister cities ==
Ustka is twinned with:

- Bielsko-Biała, Poland
- Homécourt, France
- Kappeln, Germany
- Palanga, Lithuania
- Słupsk, Poland

Former twin towns:

- Pionersky, Russia (terminated in 2022 as a result of the Russian invasion of Ukraine)
