= ORP Mewa (1966) =

Polish minesweeper

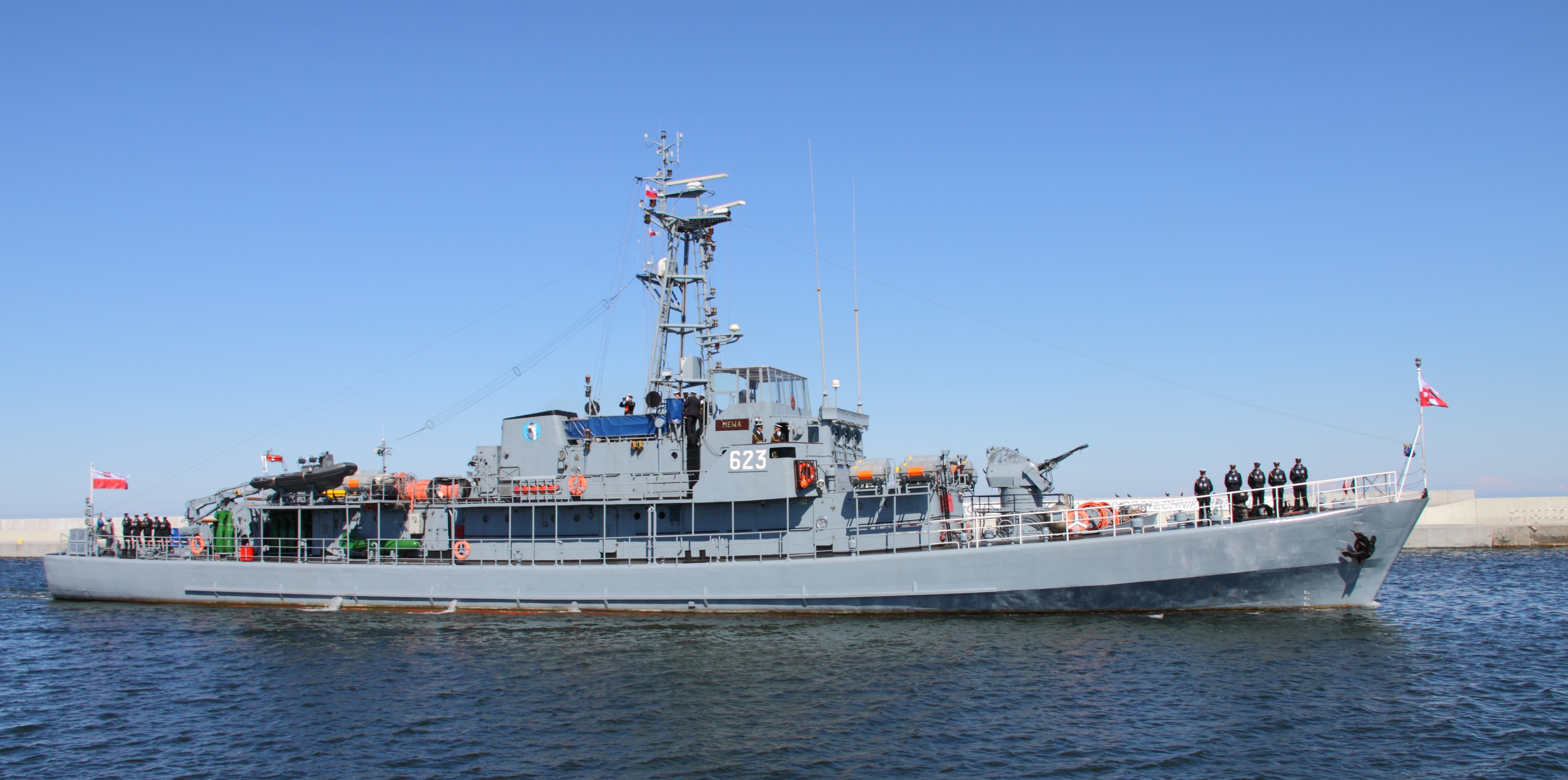
- ORP Mewa after reconstruction in 2011

History

Poland
- Name: ORP Mewa
- Builder: Stocznia Gdynia
- Laid down: July 18, 1966
- Launched: December 22, 1966
- Commissioned: May 21, 1967
- Decommissioned: December 30, 2019

General characteristics
- Class & type: Orlik-class minesweeper, Projekt 206FM-class minehunter
- Displacement: standard: 426 t (419 long tons); full: 470 t (460 long tons)
- Length: 58.2 m (190 ft 11 in)
- Draft: 2.14 m (7 ft 0 in)
- Propulsion: 2 Fiat 2312 SS diesel engines with a total power of 2648 kW (3,600 hp); 2 propellers
- Speed: 18.4 kn (34.1 km/h; 21.2 mph)
- Range: 2,000 nmi (3,700 km; 2,300 mi) at a speed of 17 kn (31 km/h; 20 mph)
- Complement: 49
- Sensors & processing systems: sonar Tamir-11M; radar Lin-M; identification friend or foe Kremnij-2; direction finding receiver ARP-50–1.2M
- Armament: 6 25 mm 2M-3M autocannons (3 x II); 2 depth charges, from 10 to 16 naval mines

ORP Mewa is a Polish base minesweeper from the Cold War era, one of a series of 12 vessels of Orlik-class, converted between 1998 and 1999 to a minehunter of Projekt 206FM. The unit measured 58.2 meters in length, 7.97 meters in width, and had a draft of 2.14 meters, with a full displacement of 470 tons. It was armed with three double sets of 25 mm 2M-3M autocannons and depth charges, and was also adapted for transporting and deploying naval mines.

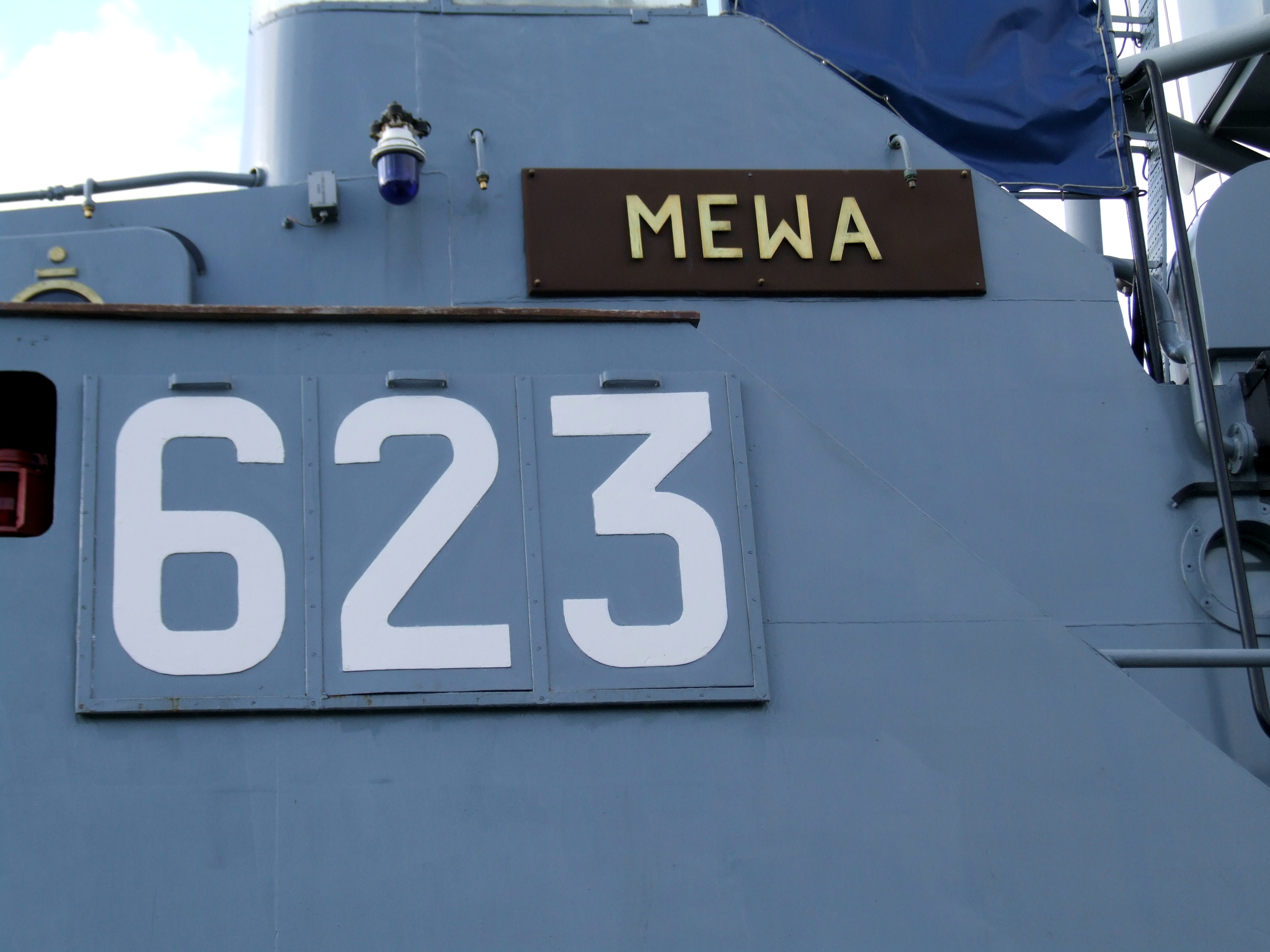
Pennant number on the superstructure (after conversion)

It was launched on 22 December 1966 at Stocznia Gdynia, and it was commissioned into the Polish Navy on 21 May 1967. The unit, designated with the pennant number 623, initially served in the 13th Minesweeper Division of the 9th Coastal Defense Flotilla in Hel, and after its dissolution in 2006, it was assigned to the 8th Coastal Defence Flotilla. In 1987, Pope John Paul II visited the vessel. ORP Mewa was part of NATO's standing mine countermeasure forces four times and participated in many international maneuvers and exercises, neutralizing dangerous remnants from World War II in Polish and foreign waters.

The intensively used ship was removed from the fleet list in December 2019. During its 52 years of service, it covered over 800,000 nautical miles and neutralized 131 dangerous underwater objects.

== Design and construction ==
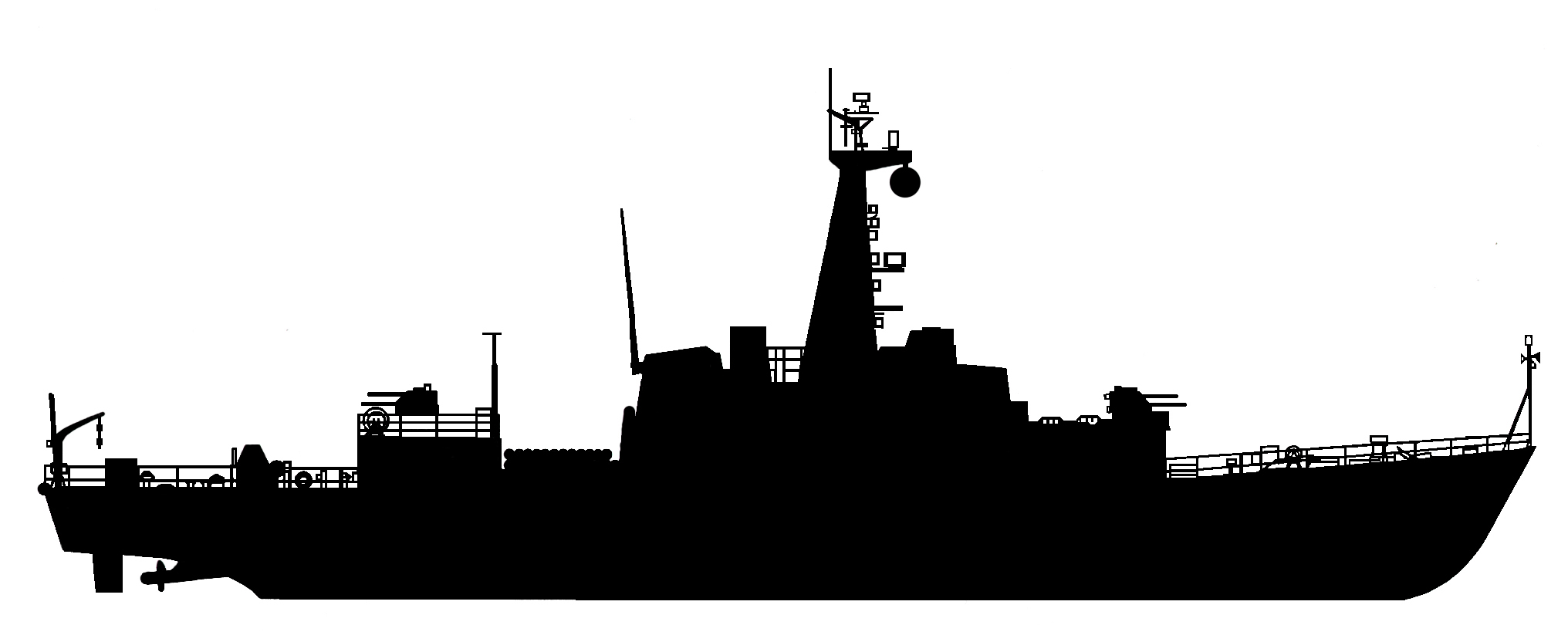
Silhouette of the Projekt 206F minesweeper

Work on a new type of minesweeper began at the Central Ship Design Bureau No. 2 in Gdańsk in 1958 to replace the Projekt 253Ł minesweepers, which had been in service since 1946. Initially, the new vessels were intended to be roadstead minesweepers, capable of conducting both contact and non-contact mine clearance operations in the vicinity of naval bases and laying small minefields. These ships were to have a displacement of approximately 200 tons, a speed of 18 knots, a range of 3,000 nautical miles, and armament consisting of two 45 mm guns and four 14.5 mm heavy machine guns, with mine clearance equipment standard for the late 1950s. Simultaneously, the Navy Command issued requirements for a new base minesweeper with a displacement of 570 tons, despite ongoing preparations for the licensed production of Soviet T43-class minesweepers. Under the leadership of engineer Henryk Andrzejewski, Central Ship Design Bureau No. 2 prepared both the design for a roadstead minesweeper (designated Projekt 206) and four designs for larger base minesweepers (Projekts 250–253). After much debate, it was decided to halt work on the Projekt 250–253 base minesweepers in favor of converting the Projekt 206 vessel into a base minesweeper. In 1959, Central Ship Design Bureau No. 2 developed a modified minesweeper design with a displacement of 425 tons, powered by Italian Fiat diesel engines, as no suitable propulsion units were being produced in socialist countries. (Note: Initially, it was planned to use Dutch RHUB 215 diesel engines with a power of 1,500 hp to power the minesweepers; however, a license could not be obtained for them (similarly to the Fiat engines, of which 24 units were ultimately purchased for a total of 2.4 million USD) (Kamiński (2008a, pp. 25–27)).) The project (designated B206F) (Note: The letter F in the project designation likely symbolizes the Fiat engines used to power the minesweepers (Ciślak (1995, p. 91)).) was approved for implementation in December 1959 by the Minister of National Defense, but the final technical design was not approved by the Navy Command until 19 February 1962. The documentation costs amounted to 1.7 million PLN, the construction of the prototype (the future Orlik) cost 80 million PLN, and the cost of a serial ship was 65.5 million PLN. The unit's annual operational limit was set at 700 hours, with the structure's lifespan estimated at 20 years.

ORP Mewa was built at Stocznia Gdynia (yard number 206F/11). Military oversight of the construction was carried out by Lieutenant Commander Konstanty Cudny. The shipyard used a method of building the vessel's hull from sections joined on the slipway, a technique previously developed for the mass production of fishing trawlers. The keel of the ship was laid on 18 July 1966, and it was launched on 22 December 1966. The minesweeper was given the traditional name for Polish mine warfare vessels, taken from a bird – a seagull (mewa). The ship's godmother was the wife of a Navy officer, Irena Ciećkowska.

== Tactical and technical data ==
The ship was a smooth-deck, ocean-going minesweeper designed for operation in conditions of partial ice cover. The overall length was 58.2 meters, width was 7.97 meters, and draft was 2.14 meters. The side height measured 4 meters. Constructed from steel, the vessel's fully welded hull was reinforced to increase resistance to underwater explosions. It was divided into seven watertight compartments: (from the bow): I – forecastle (bosun's store, ship's equipment store, food store, chain locker, and anchor windlass), II – radar station and ammunition and electrical storage, III – living quarters and gyrocompass and artillery central room, IV – auxiliary engine room, V – main engine room with propulsion control center, VI – stern crew quarters, and VII – minesweeping equipment store, steering engine, and depth charge chutes. The lowest level of the hull housed fuel tanks, freshwater, and service water tanks, as well as the propeller shafts. On the lower level of the superstructure were the officers' cabins, mess, galley, sanitary facilities, and food storage. The upper part contained the bridge and cabins for radio, navigation, and sonar, along with a command post on the signal deck covered with a tarpaulin roof and a light three-legged mast with radio equipment antennas. The standard displacement was 426 tons, while the full displacement was 470 tons. (Note: Gardiner & Chumbley (1996, p. 316) report a standard displacement of 424 tons and a full displacement of 503 tons, while Piwowoński (1989, p. 336) states that the displacement was 450/483 tons.)

The ship was powered by two non-reversible, turbocharged 12-cylinder four-stroke diesel engines in a V configuration, the FIAT 2312SS, each with a maximum power of 1,324 kW (1,800 hp; the nominal power was 1,400 hp at 920 rpm), driving two controllable pitch propellers via Lohman GUB reduction gears. The maximum speed of the vessel was 18.4 knots (economical speed – 17 knots). The ship could carry 55.5 tons of fuel, providing a range of 2,000 nautical miles at a speed of 17 knots. (Note: Kamiński (2008a, p. 26) and Koszela (2017, p. 122) state that the range was 2,000 nautical miles at a speed of 15 knots, while Piwowoński (1989, p. 336) claims it was 3,200 nautical miles at 12 knots.) At the stern, there were two balanced rudders, each with an area of 1.7 m², operated by an MS25 steering gear. Electrical power was supplied by four British main generators, Ruston S324M, each rated at 60 kVA (consisting of a generator and a Leyland SW400 engine with a power of 72 hp at 1,500 rpm), an auxiliary generator S322M rated at 27 kVA, and an electromagnetic minesweeping generator M50. The ship's autonomy was 12 days. It could safely operate in sea state 8, while performing minesweeping tasks in sea state 4, at speeds ranging from 0 to 12 knots.

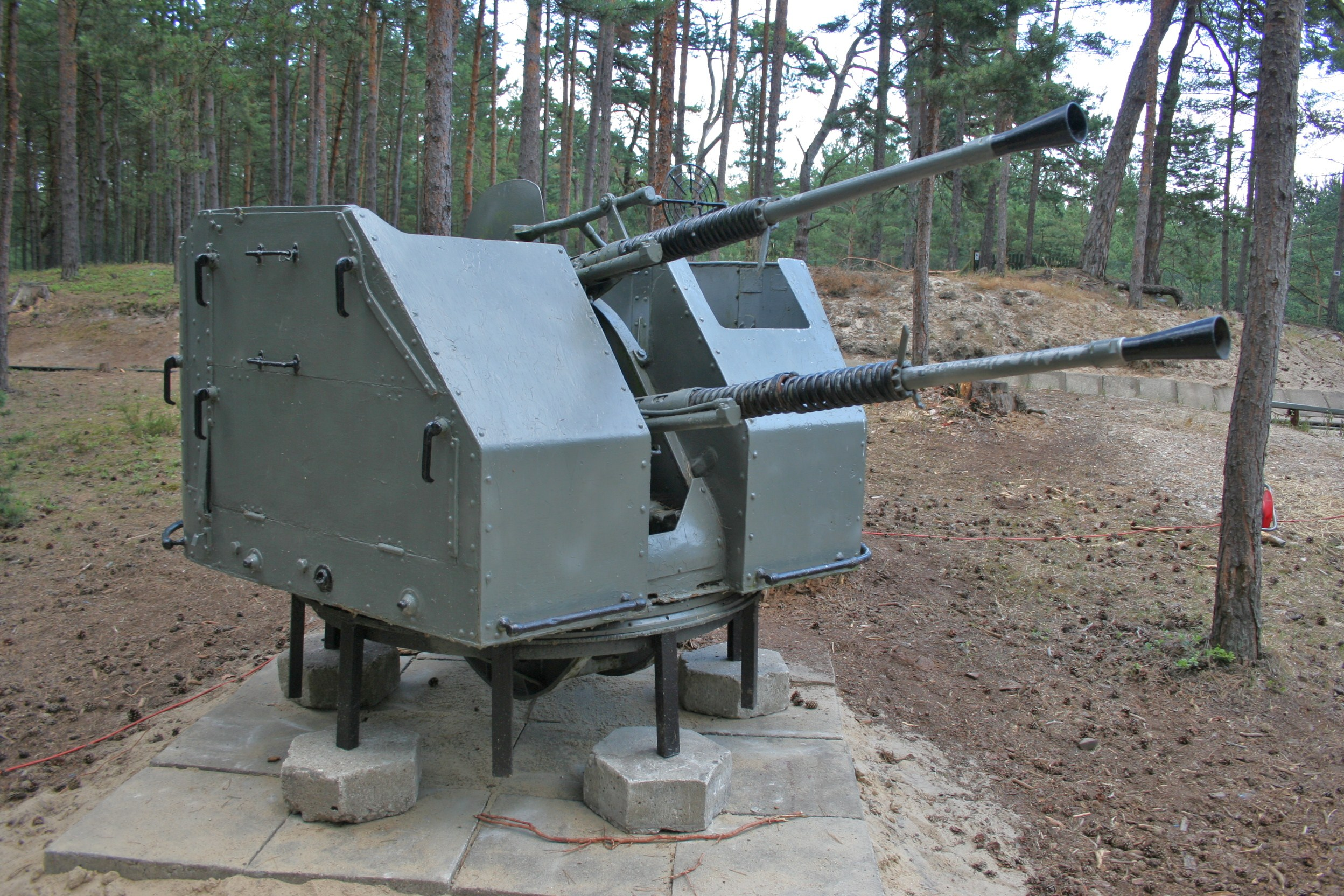
2M-3M 25 mm artillery system

The ship's initial artillery armament consisted of three twin 2M-3M 25 mm autocannons, with a total ammunition supply of 6,000 rounds. These were positioned with one mount forward of the superstructure along the ship's centerline and two mounts side by side on the aft superstructure. The anti-submarine warfare armament included two below-deck depth charge racks, with a total of 12 B-1 depth charges. Additionally, the ship was equipped with two deck-mounted mine rails, capable of alternately carrying 10 KB or AMD-500 mines, 16 08/39 mines, or 8 AMD-1000 mines. The crew was also armed with individual weapons, including 22 AK-47 rifles and 8 pistols, with a total ammunition stock of 17,000 rounds.

Minesweeping equipment included the MT-2 contact sweep, TEM-52M electromagnetic sweep, and BAT-2 acoustic sweep. The ship's electronic equipment included the Kremnij-2 identification friend or foe system, R-609 VHF radio communication station, R-644 HF transmitter, R-671 HF receiver, R-619 wideband receiver, ARP-50-1,2M direction finder, Tamir-11M (MG-11M) sonar, Lin-M general observation radar, and Rym-K radio navigation system. The ship was also equipped with 8 smoke candle racks, a Kurs-4 gyrocompass, UKPM-1M and UKPM-3M magnetic compasses, a NEŁ-5 echo sounder, MGŁ-25 chip log, and an infrared group navigation system called Chmiel.

The minesweeper was adapted for passive defense against nuclear and chemical threats. For this purpose, three rooms with filtration and ventilation devices were constructed, and dosimetric equipment, as well as decontamination spray pipelines, were installed on the ship. Degaussing equipment further supplemented the vessel's systems.

The ship's crew initially consisted of 49 personnel – 5 officers, 16 non-commissioned officers, and 28 sailors.

== Service ==
=== Service as a minesweeper (1967–1998) ===
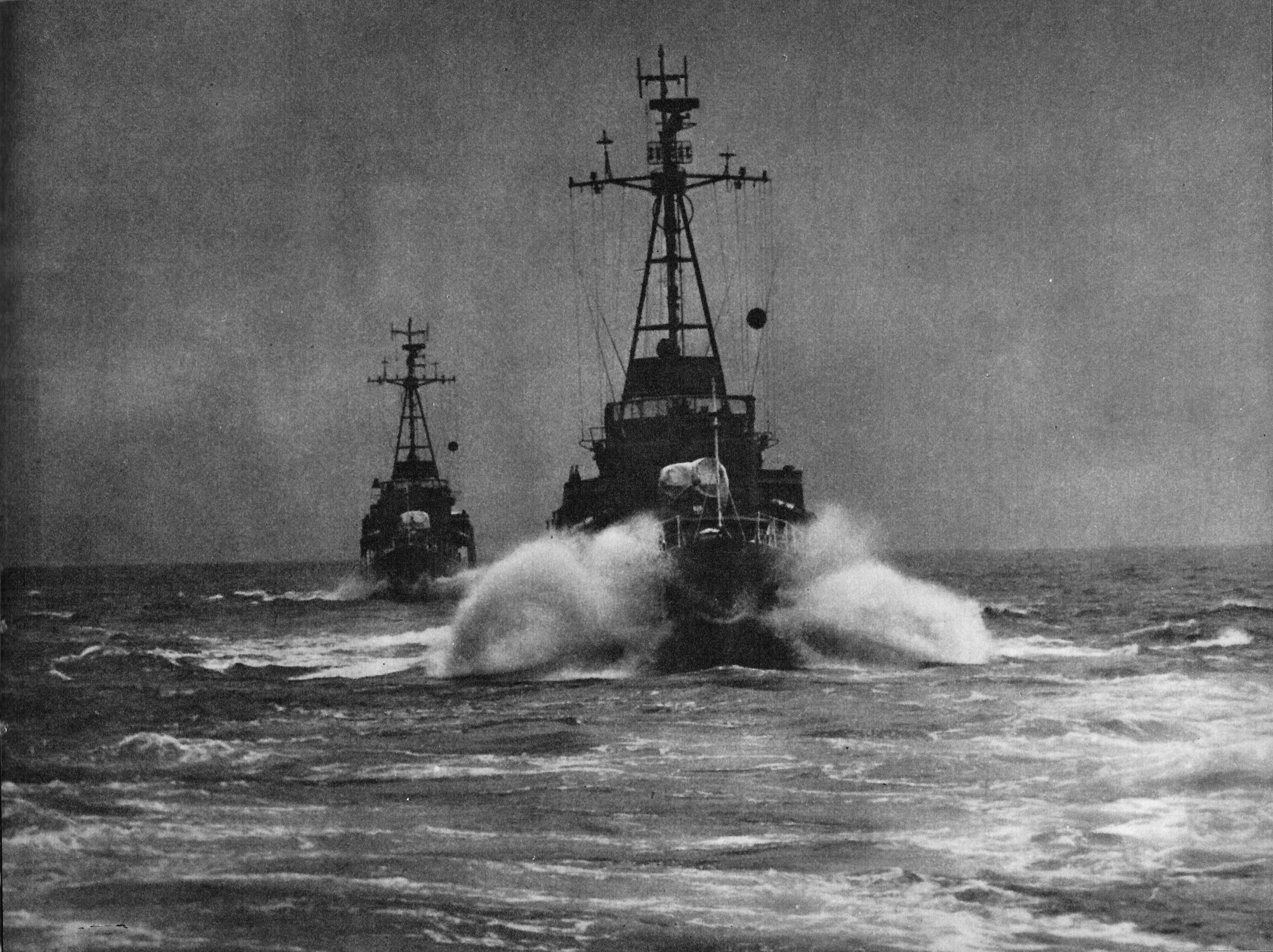
Projekt 206F minesweepers at sea

On 21 May 1967, ORP Mewa was commissioned into the Polish Navy at the War Port in Hel, under order no. 028/org. from the Navy Commander dated May 9 of that year. (Note: Kamiński (2008a, p. 29) states that the commissioning took place on 12 May 1967.) The ship, bearing the pennant number 623, joined the 13th Minesweeper Division of the 9th Coastal Defense Flotilla, stationed in Hel, with its first commander being Lieutenant Marian Brzeziński. The ship's mission included searching for and destroying minefields, conducting reconnaissance and control sweeping, plotting navigational routes, and guiding ships or ship formations behind the sweepers. Together with other minesweepers, Mewa participated in almost all major exercises of Polish ships and Warsaw Pact maneuvers, often taking part in neutralizing unexploded ordnance from World War II.

From 29 to 31 August 1967, ORP Mewa, along with other ships from the 13th Minesweeper Division, took part in Warsaw Pact naval maneuvers in the Baltic Sea. Between 24 and 29 May 1968, the ship participated in exercises under the codename Neptun. From 12 to 15 March 1969, Mewa made her first foreign visit, docking in Baltiysk. In the early 1970s, ORP Mewa was part of the 4th Group of the 13th Minesweeper Division, along with Rybitwa and Czajka. From May 25 to June 6, 1970, the ship participated in exercises under the codename Reda 70. From 24 to 29 May 1971, the ship took part in the Baltic maneuvers of three Warsaw Pact fleets under the codename Neptun 71. Between 3 and 6 May 1971, the minesweeper participated in exercises under the codename Reda 71.

From 17 to 25 May 1972, the ship was involved in mine-search operations in the area designated for the construction of the Northern Port in Gdańsk. From May 30 to June 5, the ship took part in Warsaw Pact naval exercises under the codename Bałtyk 72. On June 20, the Chief of Staff of the French Armed Forces visited Mewa. From June 29 to July 4, the ship participated in the festive Sea Holiday celebrations in Szczecin.

In May 1975, ORP Mewa, Warszawa, and Pelikan made a courtesy visit to Portsmouth. In June 1975, as part of the Navy’s new system of variable hull numbering, the ship's number was changed to 653. That same month, the ship took part in exercises under the codename Posejdon-75. In mid-1976, the ship's hull number was changed again to 678. On 27 November 1976, under the command of Captain Kazimierz Mielczarczyk, Mewa won the title of the best Navy ship in its class. The ship reverted to its original pennant number (623) in mid-1978. From 4 to 26 May 1983, the minesweeper participated in major Polish Navy exercises under the codename Reda-83.

From 6 to 11 April 1987, the ship took part in the Reda 87 exercises. During Pope John Paul II's third pilgrimage to Poland, on the evening of 11 June 1987, the Pope boarded Mewa in Gdynia for a voyage to Sopot. The next day, John Paul II used Mewa twice more, sailing from Sopot to Westerplatte in the morning and then through the Green Gate. (Note: Earlier, the artillery armament and mine-sweeping equipment were removed from the ship to make room for a seat and rest areas for the pope and his entourage (Kamiński (2008a, p. 29); Krzewiński (2014, p. 70)).) From 6 to 9 August 1987, ORP Mewa, Orlik, and Wodnik, under the command of Captain Kazimierz Wolan, made a visit to Helsinki. In August 1988, the ship took part in Warsaw Pact naval exercises near Baltiysk. In June 1989, the ship participated in a navigational voyage to ports in Tallinn and Riga.

In June 1992, the ship took part in the prestigious Kiel Week regatta in Kiel. Between 1989 and 1991, the minesweeper was commanded by Captain Andrzej Karweta, who later became Navy Commander with the rank of vice admiral. From 6 to 18 June 1995, the ship (along with twin minesweepers ORP Tukan, Czajka, and Flaming, the submarine Wilk, and missile ships Hutnik and Metalowiec) participated in NATO naval exercises BALTOPS '95. From 2 to 14 October 1995, the ship took part in the Belgian Navy’s mine defense exercises Sandy Coast (together with the minehunters Czajka and Rybitwa and the tanker Bałtyk). From 14 to 16 September 1996, ORP Mewa, together with mine destroyers: the Belgian Lobelia and Primula and the Dutch Zierikzee, as well as Polish minesweepers Czajka, Flaming, and Śniardwy, participated in mine search and destruction operations on the sea lanes in the Gdańsk Bay.

During its long service, the ship's electronic equipment was modernized: the Lin-M radar was replaced with a newer TRN-823, the Kremnij-2 identification friend or foe was replaced with Nichrom-RR, and a second SRN-2061 radar station was added. The outdated Rym-K radionavigation system was also removed and replaced with a more modern Bras system (with the Hals receiver); British Decca Pirs-1M radionavigation receivers were also installed. In the early 1980s, the ship's anti-aircraft armament was enhanced by installing two quadruple Fasta-4M launchers for 9K32 Strela-2 anti-aircraft missiles (with a total of 16 missiles) on both sides of the funnel. Changes also affected the sweeping equipment: the MT-2 contact sweep was upgraded to the MT-2W variant (with explosive cutters), and new Polish electromagnetic sweep TEM-PE-2 and deep-water, high-speed acoustic sweep BGAT were installed.

=== Conversion into a minehunter ===
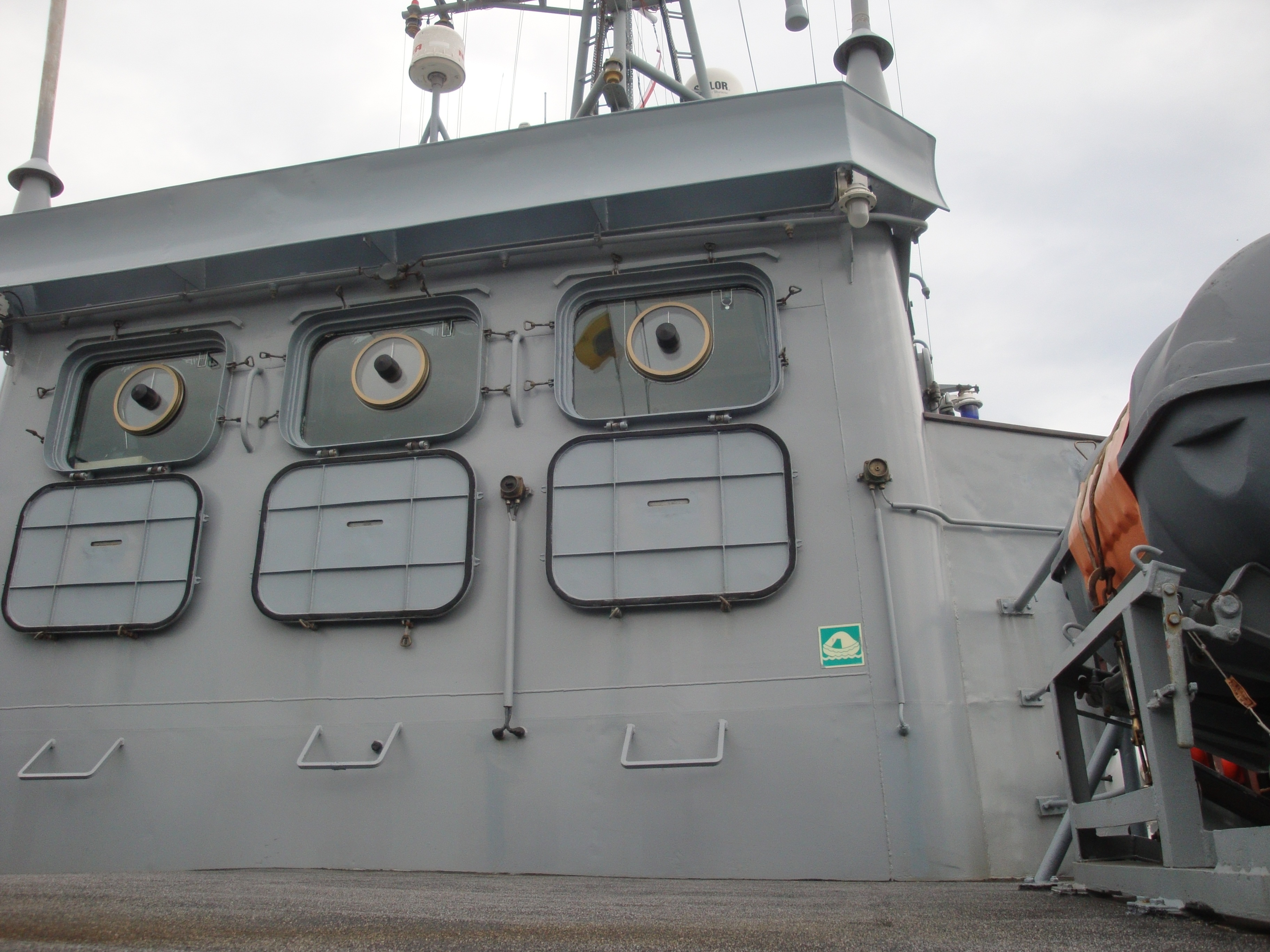
New superstructure from the front

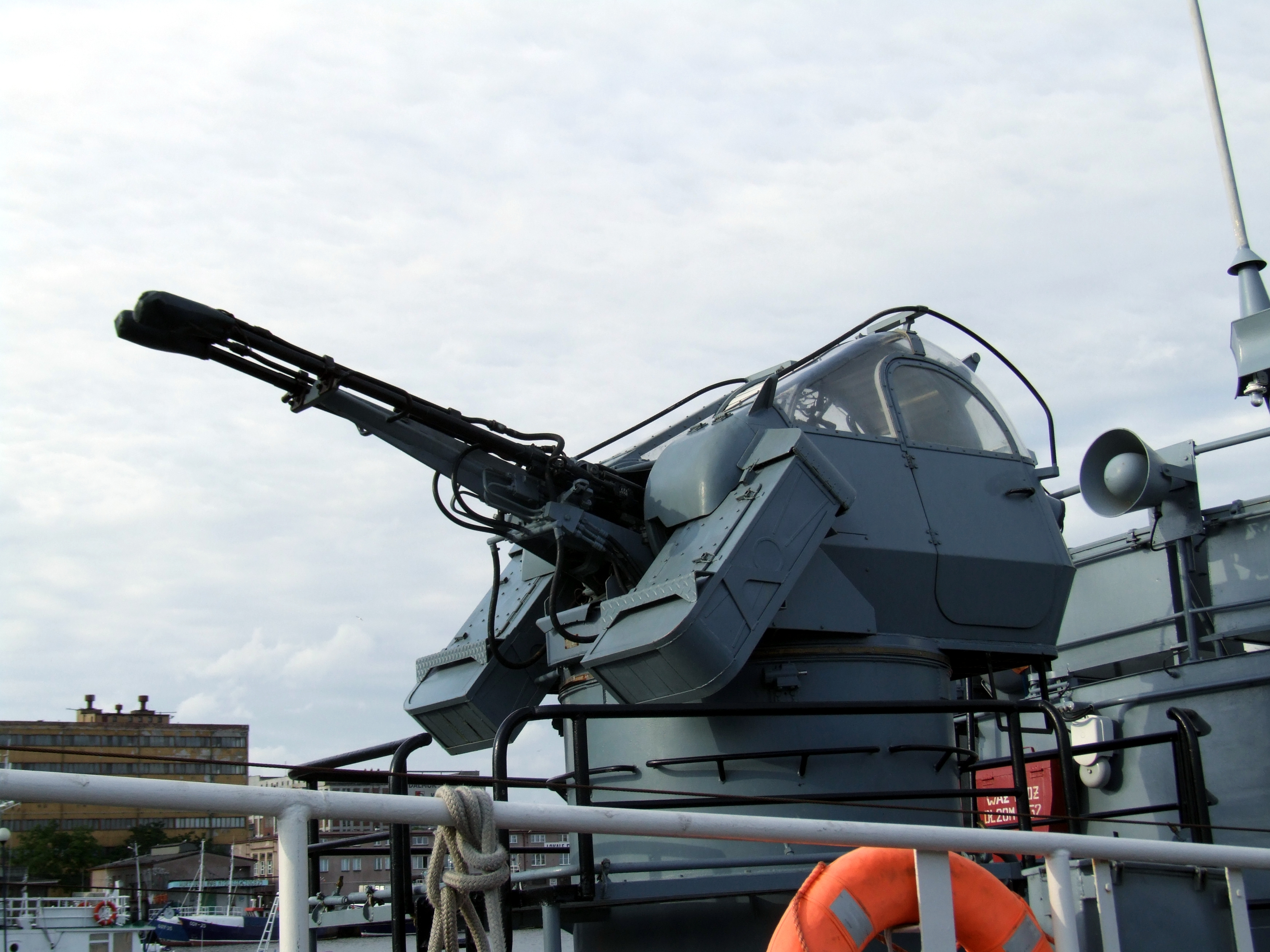
ZU-23-2MR Wróbel II cannon on Mewa

In May 1998, Mewa was decommissioned and underwent conversion into a Projekt 206FM-class minehunter, which took place between July 1998 and April 1999. The modernization project was developed at the Polish Navy Shipyard in Gdynia and was carried out under the supervision of engineer Eugeniusz Pawłowski. Most of the ship's compartments and internal hull structure were rebuilt, now divided into 10 watertight sections. Parts of the hull were replaced, and the ship received a completely new, larger superstructure, funnel, and tripod mast. The superstructure housed, among other things, the main command post and a two-compartment diving chamber from the Szczecin-based company Aquaticus, intended for new crew members – divers.

Instead of the three 25 mm cannon mounts, a ZU-23-2MR Wróbel II missile-artillery system was installed. The two quad launchers for 9K32 Strela-2 missiles were retained, and the ship was stripped of its depth charge racks. The ship's mine rails were adapted to carry, interchangeably, 12 OS-type mines, 12 MMD-1 mines, 12 MMD-2 mines, or 6 OD-type mines. The anti-mine equipment was also upgraded, now including the MT-2W contact mine (with Bofors explosive cutters), the TEM-PE-2MA electromagnetic mine, the MTA-2 acoustic mine, and two Ukwiał underwater vehicles (designed and built at Gdańsk University of Technology).

The ship's electronic equipment was modernized as well, now consisting of the Pstrokosz command support system, the Decca Bridge Master navigation radar, the SHL-100MA sonar station, the SHL-200 Flaming B towed sonar station, the Jemiołuszka precision navigation system, and the Supraśl identification friend or foe system. Other installations included a FIN Skog electronic navigational chart set, HF and UHF fibre optic gyrocompasses by Rohde & Schwarz, a C.Plath fiber-optic gyrocompass, a STN Atlas Doppler log, and the MORS shipwide broadcast system. A set of six WNP81/9 Jastrząb decoy launchers was installed, and the worn-out Fiat engines were replaced with six-cylinder Cegielski-Sulzer 6AL25/30 diesel engines, each with a maximum power output of 1,700 hp (nominally 1,100 hp at 750 rpm). The power generators were also replaced with new units.

An environmentally important modification was the installation of a new sewage treatment plant, recovered oil and oily water tanks, and a seawater desalination unit. The new equipment increased the ship's full displacement to 507 tons and raised the crew size to 54 members. (Note: Krzewiński (2014, p. 68) states that the full displacement increased to 559 tons.) The modernization cost between 58 and 60 million PLN.

=== Service as a minehunter (1999–2019) ===
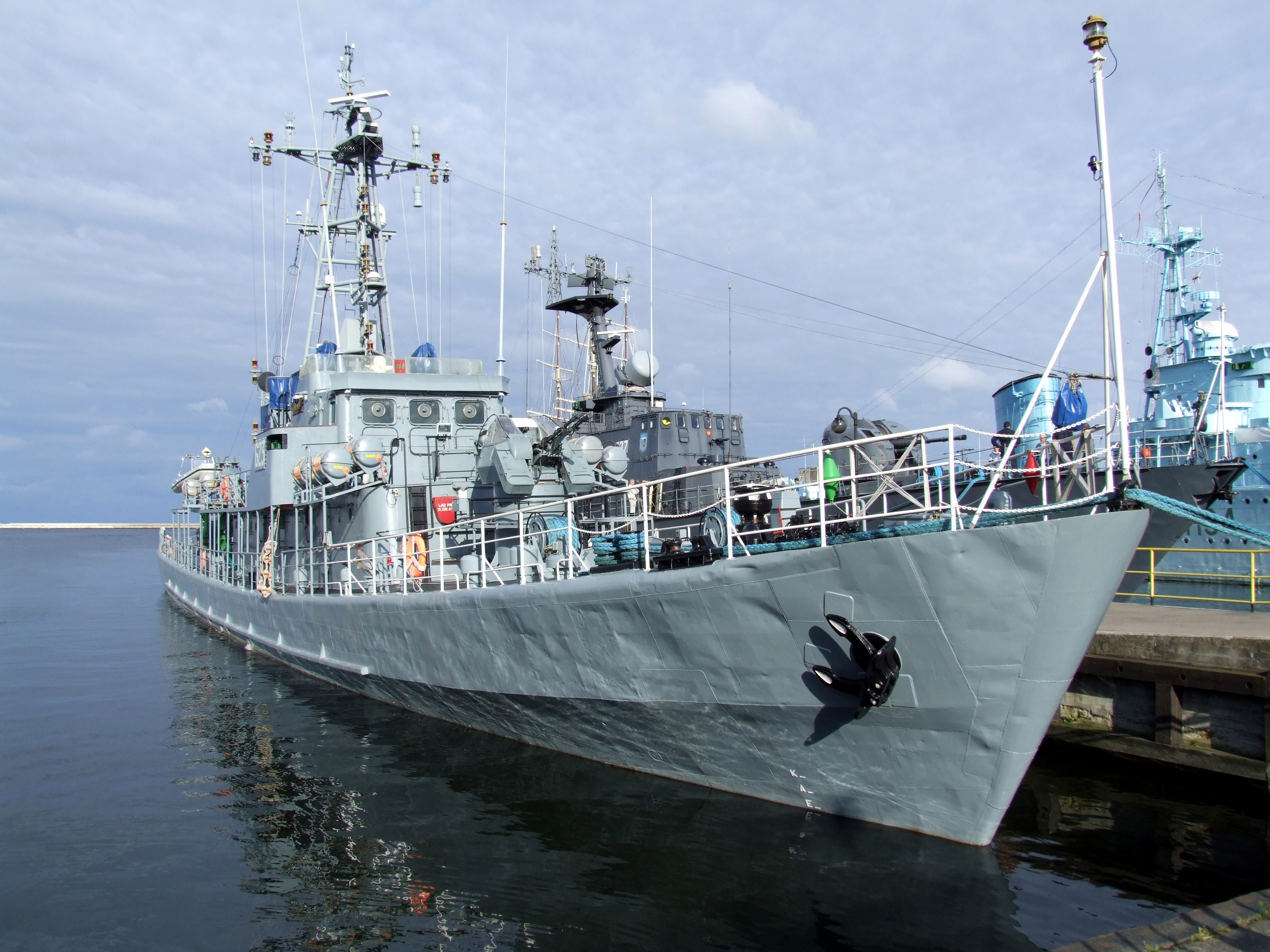
Mewa after reconstruction in 2007

On 14 May 1999, in the presence of the Minister of National Defense Janusz Onyszkiewicz, a ceremony took place to recommission the ship into service under the command of Commander Wiesław Puchalski. On June 21, Prime Minister Jerzy Buzek visited the vessel. In August, the ship participated in the 80th-anniversary celebrations of the Latvian Naval Forces in Riga. In October, Mewa took part in the international Sandy Coast defense exercises in the North Sea, docking in Den Helder, Netherlands, on October 25. In December, ORP Mewa, Śniardwy, and Gopło participated in Passex exercises with NATO’s Standing Mine Countermeasures Group (MCMForNorth).

On 16 February 2000, the ship helped neutralize two torpedoes lying on the seabed near Gdynia. From May 8 to 22, Mewa participated with the minesweepers Śniardwy and Gopło in the international Blue Game 2000 exercises held in the Norwegian and Baltic Seas. From June 3 to 16, the ship took part in NATO’s BALTOPS 2000 naval exercises in the Baltic Sea, alongside ORP Kaszub, Śniardwy, Wigry, Górnik, Rolnik, Orkan, and Bałtyk. After the exercises, Mewa visited Kiel for Kiel Week 2000. In the second half of the year, the ship underwent a minor modernization at the Naval Shipyard in Gdynia, where improvements were made to the galley, ventilation system, and stronger hydraulic actuators for the sweep gear were installed. On September 19, Prince Andrew, Duke of York, visited Mewa. In early November, the vessel collaborated for the first time with NATO’s MCMForNorth, taking part in two-week maneuvers. On December 21, Mewa was named the best ship of the 9th Coastal Defense Flotilla and the best combat ship of the Polish Navy for the year 2000.

From 12 to 14 February 2001, ORP Mewa and torpedo trials craft K-8, along with diver-miners, took part in the retrieval and subsequent detonation of two World War II torpedoes at a naval training ground. An identical operation was conducted from February 26 to March 3, neutralizing two more torpedoes near Kościuszko Square in Gdynia. From April 21 to May 12, Mewa and Czajka, along with NATO’s MCMForNorth, participated in the Blue Game 2001 exercises in the Danish Straits. From May 21 to 25, the vessel participated in the Squadex mine countermeasure exercises, which included Polish ships ORP Czajka, Gopło, and Wdzydze, as well as the German minesweeper Laboe, the Estonian ships Wambola and Admiral Pitka, and the Latvian ship Viesturs. From September 6 to 21, Mewa was stationed in Ostend, Belgium, where her crew underwent training for NATO assignments. From September 24 to October 5, the ship participated in Sandy Coast 2001 exercises in the North Sea. From October 22 to 27, Mewa joined Czajka and MCMForNorth in Passex exercises, returning to Hel on October 8 after 30 days at sea and covering a distance of 1,500 nautical miles.

From 1 to 15 March 2002, NATO naval exercises codenamed Strong Resolve 2002 took place in Poland and Norway, involving over 100 ships. 14 Polish vessels participated in exercises conducted in the Norwegian, North, and Baltic Seas, including ORP Mewa, Orzeł, Lech, Gniezno, Poznań, Orkan, Metalowiec, Rolnik, Flaming, Czajka, Semko, Kaszub, Zawzięty, and Zwinny. On October 12, Mewa became the first Polish vessel to join NATO's MCMForNorth, where she served until 12 December 2002 under the command of Captain Cezary Gnoza, visiting ports such as Turku, Helsinki, Gdynia, and Frederikshavn. Between 18 and 26 October 2002, ORP Mewa and Czajka participated in international Open Spirit 2002 mine countermeasure exercises in the Gulf of Riga, and from November 25 to 30, they, along with ORP Flaming, took part in Passex exercises in Polish waters.

On 27 February 2003, Mewa hosted a Latvian delegation, including President Vaira Vīķe-Freiberga, Defense Minister Ģirts Valdis Kristovskis, and Navy Commander Ilmārs Lešinskis. From April 28 to May 16, the ship, alongside Czajka and the transport-minelayer ORP Poznań, participated in the Blue Game 2003 exercises in the Danish Straits and southern Baltic. On July 20, the Commander of the Indonesian Navy visited Mewa.

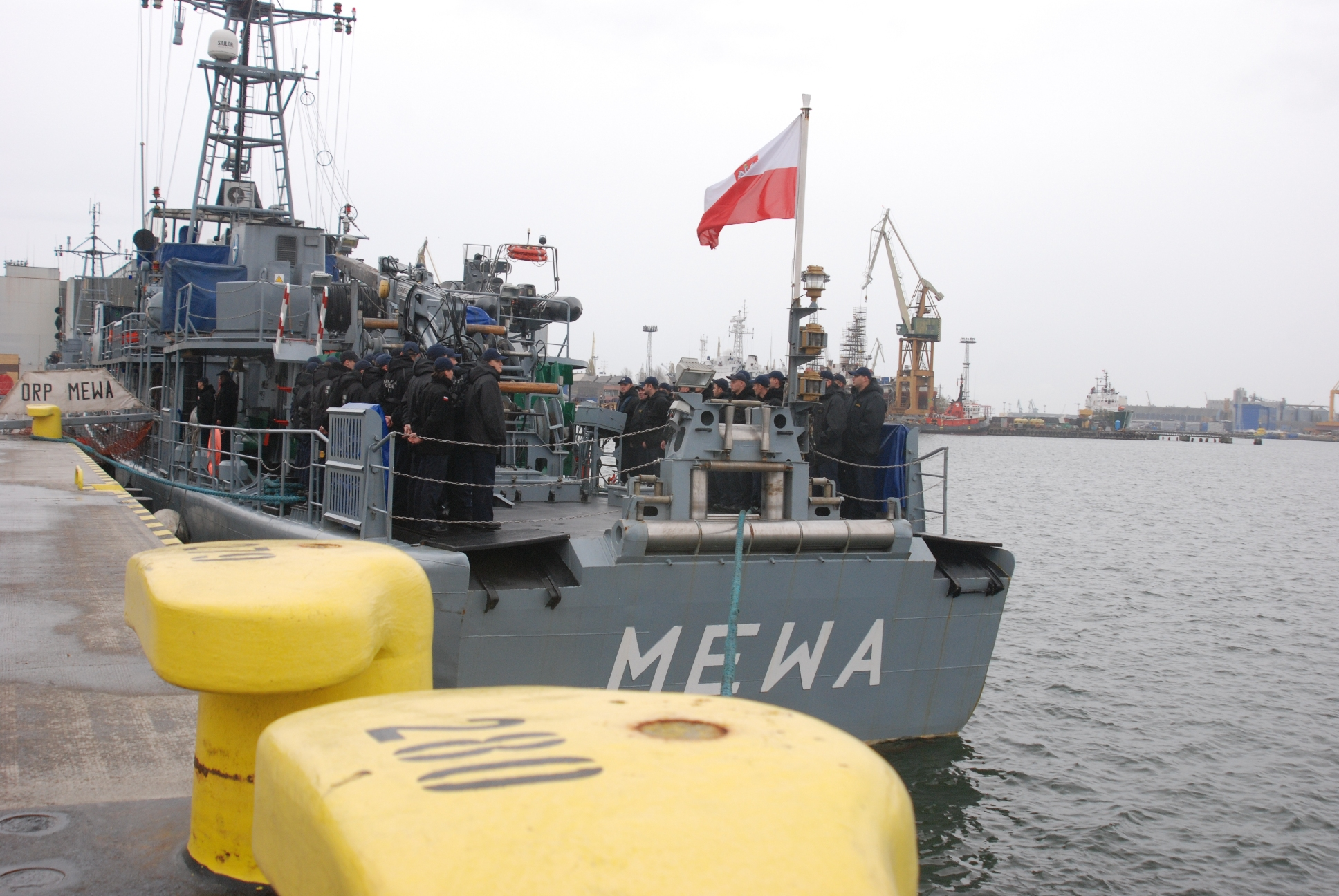
Ship from the stern, 2010

From 4 to 19 June 2004, the vessel participated in NATO's BALTOPS 2004 naval exercises in the Baltic Sea, which involved 31 ships (Poland was represented by ORP Mewa, Sokół, Kaszub, Sarbsko, Bukowo, and Poznań). From August 8 to 12, the ship attended the 85th anniversary celebrations of the Latvian Navy in Riga, with Fleet Admiral Roman Krzyżelewski, Commander of the Polish Navy, in attendance.

From 8 to 29 April 2005, ORP Mewa and Kondor took part in NATO's Loyal Mariner 05 exercises in the North Sea, Kattegat, and Skagerrak. From August 16 to October 24, 2005, Mewa joined the Standing NATO Response Force Mine-countermeasures Group 1 (SNMCMG1), operating in the Atlantic, North Sea, and Danish Straits, visiting Glasgow, Faslane, Copenhagen, Sønderborg, Zeebrugge, and Rønne. In September 2005, the ship participated in Danex-05 international exercises in the Baltic Sea, which involved vessels from 13 countries (Poland was represented by ORP Gen. K. Pułaski, Sokół, and two Mil Mi-14PŁ ASW helicopters). From November 14 to 17, ORP Mewa, Flaming, Gopło, and Wigry conducted Passex exercises with SNMCMG1, which was visiting Gdynia.

At the turn of 2005 and 2006, the Jastrząb decoy launchers were removed from the ship. In May 2006, Mewa and 12 other ships participated in the international MCOPLAT '06 operation to destroy unexploded ordnance in the Gulf of Riga. In June 2006, following the disbandment of the 9th Coastal Defense Flotilla, Mewa and the entire 13th Minesweeper Squadron were transferred to Gdynia, becoming part of the 8th Coastal Defense Flotilla. ORP Mewa and 19 other vessels took part in the largest annual exercises of the Polish Armed Forces, Anakonda 2006, held from September 21 to 29.

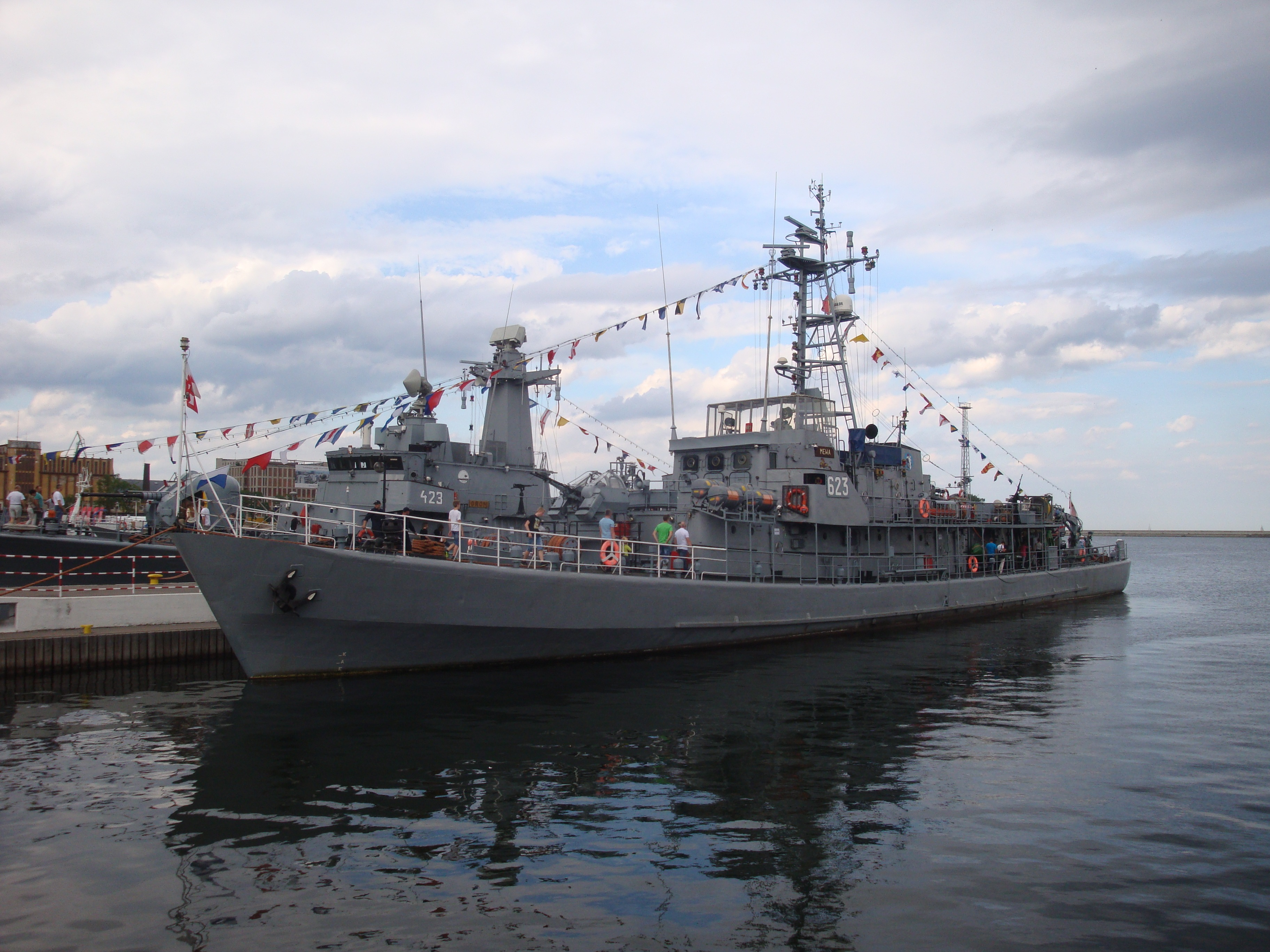
Mewa in full-dress with flags, 2016

In 2007, an Automatic Identification System was installed on the ship. In May, the vessel celebrated its 40th anniversary of service in the Polish Navy. Between August 31 and September 10, ORP Mewa and Czajka participated in the international mine countermeasure exercise Open Spirit 2007, held in the waters of the Baltic States. From October 17 to 19, the ship took part in a challenging operation to neutralize seven World War II torpedoes lying on the seabed of the Bay of Puck, directed by Commander Piotr Mieczkowski of the 13th Minesweeper Squadron. Three of the submerged missiles were armed and were detonated on-site using the Ukwiał vehicle, while the remaining four were brought to the surface. On November 6, ORP Mewa, Flaming, Gopło, and Mamry participated in the international mine countermeasure exercise MCM SQNEX in the Baltic Sea (also participating were the Latvian vessels Virsaitis and Viesturs and the Lithuanian ship Kuršis). On 10 December 2007, the Gdynia Branch of the Maritime Technical Division of the Armed Forces Supply Department signed a contract worth 10.3 million PLN with the Naval Shipyard in Gdynia for the ship's operational overhaul.

Between August 31 and September 11, 2009, in the waters of the Gulf of Riga, ORP Mewa (commanded by Captain Arkadiusz Kurdybelski) and Flaming participated in the mine countermeasure operation Open Spirit 2009. Both vessels destroyed 10 mines, with a total weight of about 3 tons, and Mewa served as the command ship of one of the operational teams. From November 6 to 9, ORP Mewa, Flaming, Mamry, and Gopło took part in the international MCM SQNEX 09 exercises in the Baltic Sea.

On 19 January 2010, naval divers from Mewa neutralized an unexploded 152 mm artillery shell that had been discovered by a dredger near the port of Gdańsk. From March 15 to 18, four units from the 13th Minesweeper Squadron (ORP Mewa, Śniardwy, Gopło, and Mamry) participated in exercises with SNMCMG1 ships in the waters of the Gulf of Gdańsk, led by ORP Kontradmirał Xawery Czernicki. On August 3, the ship joined NATO's Standing NATO Response Force Mine-countermeasures Group 1 (SNMCMG1) for the third time, this time under Polish command (led by Commander Krzysztof Rybak). During this mission, the ship sailed 6,700 nautical miles, taking part in the Danex-10, Northern Coast, Joint Warrior, and Passex exercises and visiting ports in Finland, Denmark, Scotland, Germany, Norway, and Ireland. In September, the ship underwent repairs at the Crist shipyard in Gdańsk. On September 27, the 13th Minesweeper Squadron, along with Mewa, was subordinated to the command of the 3rd Ship Flotilla.

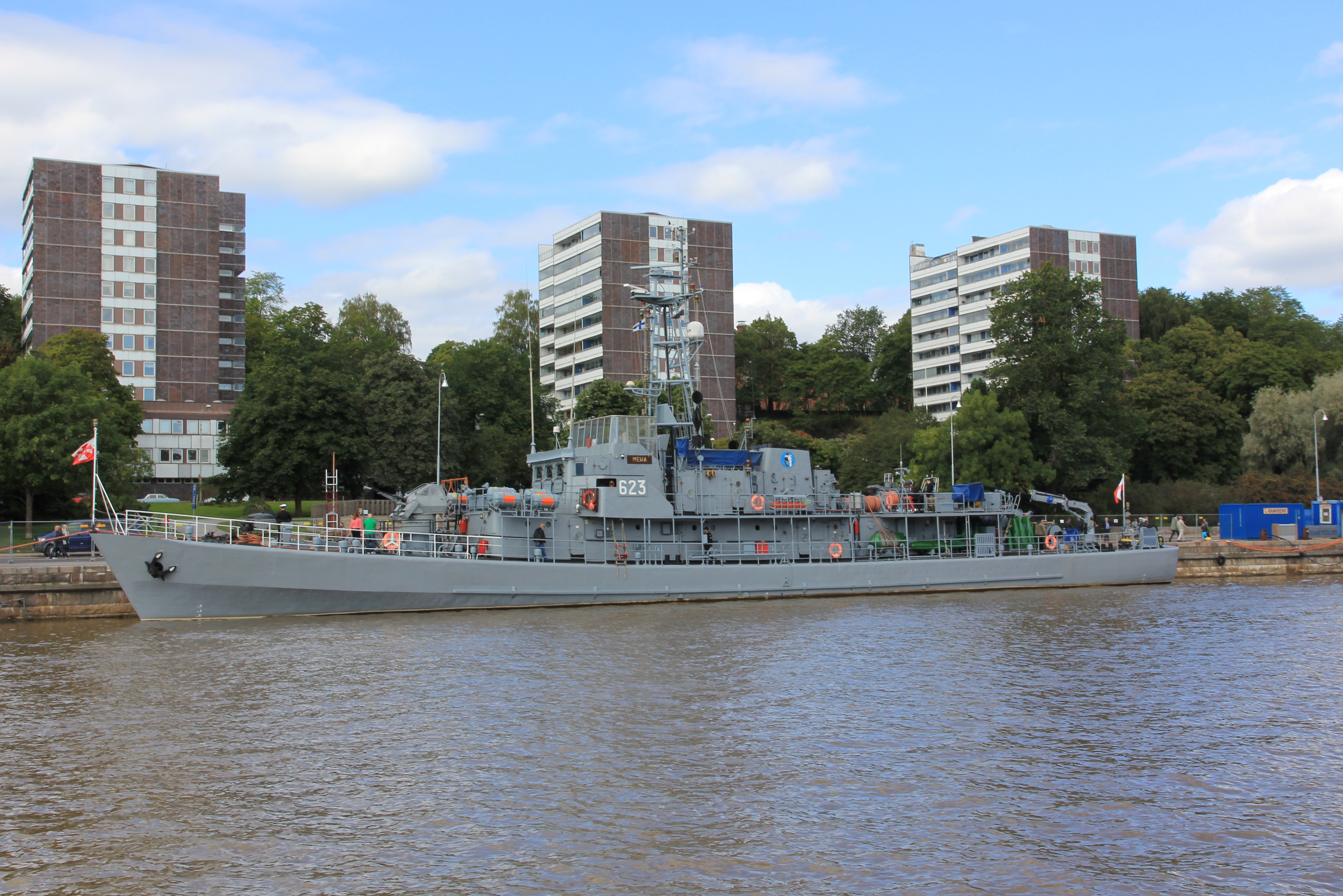
Ship during a visit to Turku, 2014

From 23 to 27 May 2011, Mewa participated in the naval portion of the Polish Armed Forces exercise Rekin 2011 (along with ORP Kondor, Generał Tadeusz Kościuszko, Orkan, Piorun, Sarbsko, Nakło, Drużno, Śniardwy, Czajka, Lublin, Poznań, Toruń, Piast, Zbyszko, Bałtyk, Hydrograf, and Arctowski). In June, on the occasion of the Navy Day, the ship was open for tours in Gdynia. From August 22 to September 5, Mewa participated in the Open Spirit 2011 operation in the waters of the Gulf of Riga, destroying a German non-contact bottom mine weighing 300 kg.

On 12 June 2012, on the 25th anniversary of John Paul II’s third pilgrimage to Poland, Vatican Cardinal Secretary of State Tarcisio Bertone took a cruise on Mewa. In September, ORP Mewa, Sokół, Czajka, Gopło, Śniardwy, Lech, Maćko, Hydrograf, Arctowski, H-7, H-8, Poznań, Toruń, Gardno, Bukowo, Jamno, Mielno, and Nakło took part in the largest annual Polish Armed Forces exercise, Anakonda 12.

On 1 November 2013, the ship was once again subordinated to the 8th Coastal Defense Flotilla. From April 9 to 12, Mewa’s crew, along with a group of naval mine divers, participated in the recovery of German steam torpedoes from World War II, type G7a, resting on the seabed near the entrance to the port of Gdynia.

From 1 to 12 September 2014, ORP Mewa, Flaming, Hańcza, Nakło, and Drużno took part in the Northern Coast 2014 exercises in the Gulf of Bothnia. In the last week of October, the crew of ORP Mewa successfully completed certification ahead of the ship’s planned 2015 service with NATO’s Mine Countermeasures Response Force.

From February 23 to June 23, 2015, ORP Mewa entered the NATO Response Force Mine-countermeasures Group Group 1 (SNMCMG1) for the fourth time, taking part in exercises and maneuvers including Route Survey Kiel, Beneficial Cooperation, Joint Warrior 2015, Baltic Fortress, Open Spirit 2015, and BALTOPS 2015.

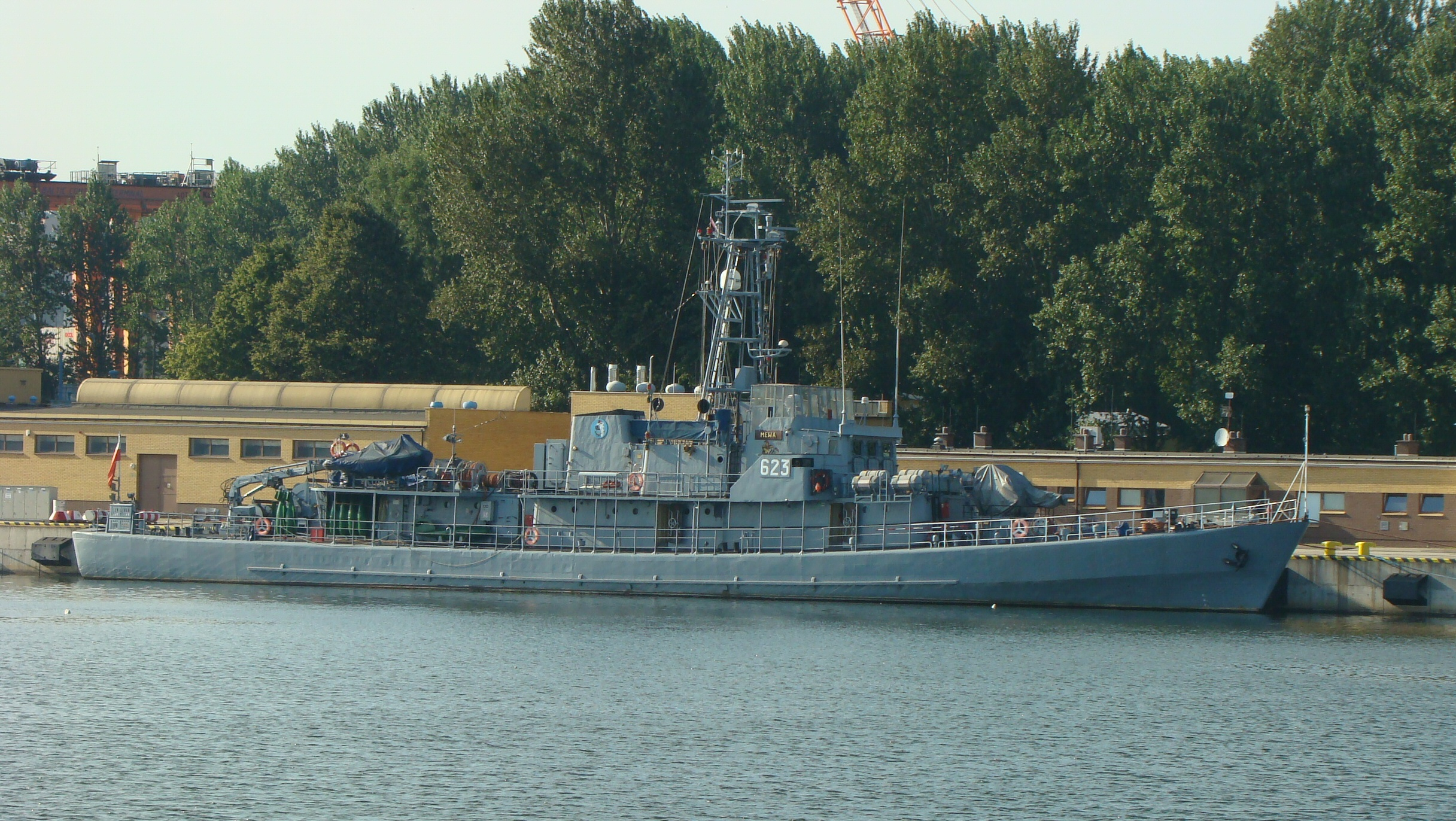
Mewa in Gdynia, 2017

In May 2017, the ship celebrated its 50th anniversary in service with the Polish Navy. On June 10/11, as part of the celebrations of the 30th anniversary of John Paul II’s third pilgrimage to Poland, the ship was open for tours.

On 8 July 2019, Mewa held its farewell cruise in the Gulf of Gdańsk, with former commanders and crew members onboard. The final flag-lowering took place on 30 December 2019 in Basin VIII of the Naval Port in Gdynia, attended by Navy Inspector Rear Admiral Jarosław Ziemiański and Commander of the 8th Coastal Defense Flotilla Counter Admiral Piotr Neć. During its 52 years and 236 days of service, the ship was commanded by 20 captains, traveled over 800,000 nautical miles, and neutralized 131 underwater hazardous objects.

== Bibliography ==
- Ciślak, Jarosław (1995). Polska Marynarka Wojenna 1995: okręty, samoloty i śmigłowce, uzbrojenie, organizacja [Polish Navy 1995: ships, airplanes and helicopters, armament, organization] (in Polish) (I ed.). Warsaw: Lampart & Bellona. ISBN 83-86776-08-0.
- Gardiner, Robert; Chumbley, Stephen, eds. (1996). Conway's All The World's Fighting Ships 1947-1995. Annapolis: Naval Institute Press. ISBN 1-55750-132-7.
- Kamiński, Jerzy M. (2008). "Współczesne "ptaszki" czyli historia projektu 206" [Modern "Birdies" or the history of Project 206]. Morze, Statki i Okręty (in Polish). 9 (81). Magnum-X. ISSN 1426-529X.
- Kamiński, Jerzy M. (2008). "Na drodze do pierwszego polskiego niszczyciela min. Okręty projektu 206FM" [On the road to the first Polish minesweeper: Project 206FM ships]. Morze, Statki i Okręty (in Polish). 11 (83). Magnum-X. ISSN 1426-529X.
- Kluczyński, Marian (2017). "Złote gody papieskiego okrętu" [Golden anniversary of the papal ship]. Morze, Statki i Okręty (in Polish). 7–8 (181). Magnum-X. ISSN 1426-529X.
- Koszela, Witold (2017). Okręty Floty Polskiej [Ships of the Polish Fleet] (in Polish). Vol. II. Oświęcim: Napoleon V. ISBN 978-83-65746-68-9.
- Krzewiński, Jacek (2014). "Niszczyciele min projektu 206FM" [Project 206FM minesweepers]. Okręty (in Polish). 1 (31). KAGERO. ISSN 1898-1518.
- Pater, Walter (1994). "Polskie trałowce typu Orlik (proj. "206F")" [Polish Orlik-class trawlers (proj. "206F")]. Okręty Wojenne (in Polish). 11. Tarnowskie Góry. ISSN 1231-014X.
- Pietlewannyj, M. B. (2009). Korabli stran Warszawskogo dogowora Корабли стран Варшавского договора [Ships of the Warsaw Pact countries] (in Russian). Saint Petersburg: Galeja Print. ISBN 978-5-8172-0127-7.
- Piwowoński, Jan (1989). Flota spod biało-czerwonej [The fleet under the white and red] (in Polish). Warsaw: Nasza Księgarnia. ISBN 83-10-08902-3.
- Rochowicz, Robert (2020). "Narcyz – system zmiennych numerów burtowych" [Narcyz – system of variable hull numbers]. Morze, Statki i Okręty (in Polish). 11–12 (201). Magnum-X. ISSN 1426-529X.
- Serafin, Mieczysław (2008). Polska Marynarka Wojenna 1945-2007. Kronika wydarzeń [Polish Navy 1945–2007: A Chronicle of Events] (in Polish). Gdynia: Zespół Redakcyjno-Wydawniczy Marynarki Wojennej. ISBN 978-83-88698-03-3.
- Sołkiewicz, Henryk, ed. (2015). Ewolucyjny rozwój sił okrętowych Marynarki Wojennej w latach 1945–2010 [The Evolutionary Development of the Naval Forces of the Polish Navy in 1945–2010] (in Polish). Gdynia: Wydawnictwo BP/Akademia Marynarki Wojennej. ISBN 978-83-941308-4-8.
- Stefański, Krzysztof (2016). "Papieski okręt" [Papal Ship]. Okręty (in Polish). 6 (48). KAGERO. ISSN 1898-1518.
- Wąsiewski, Józef (ed.). Kalendarium dziejów polskiej Marynarki Wojennej 1918–1993 [Chronology of the History of the Polish Navy 1918–1993] (in Polish). Gdynia: Dowództwo Marynarki Wojennej.
