= ORP Gardno =

Polish minesweeper

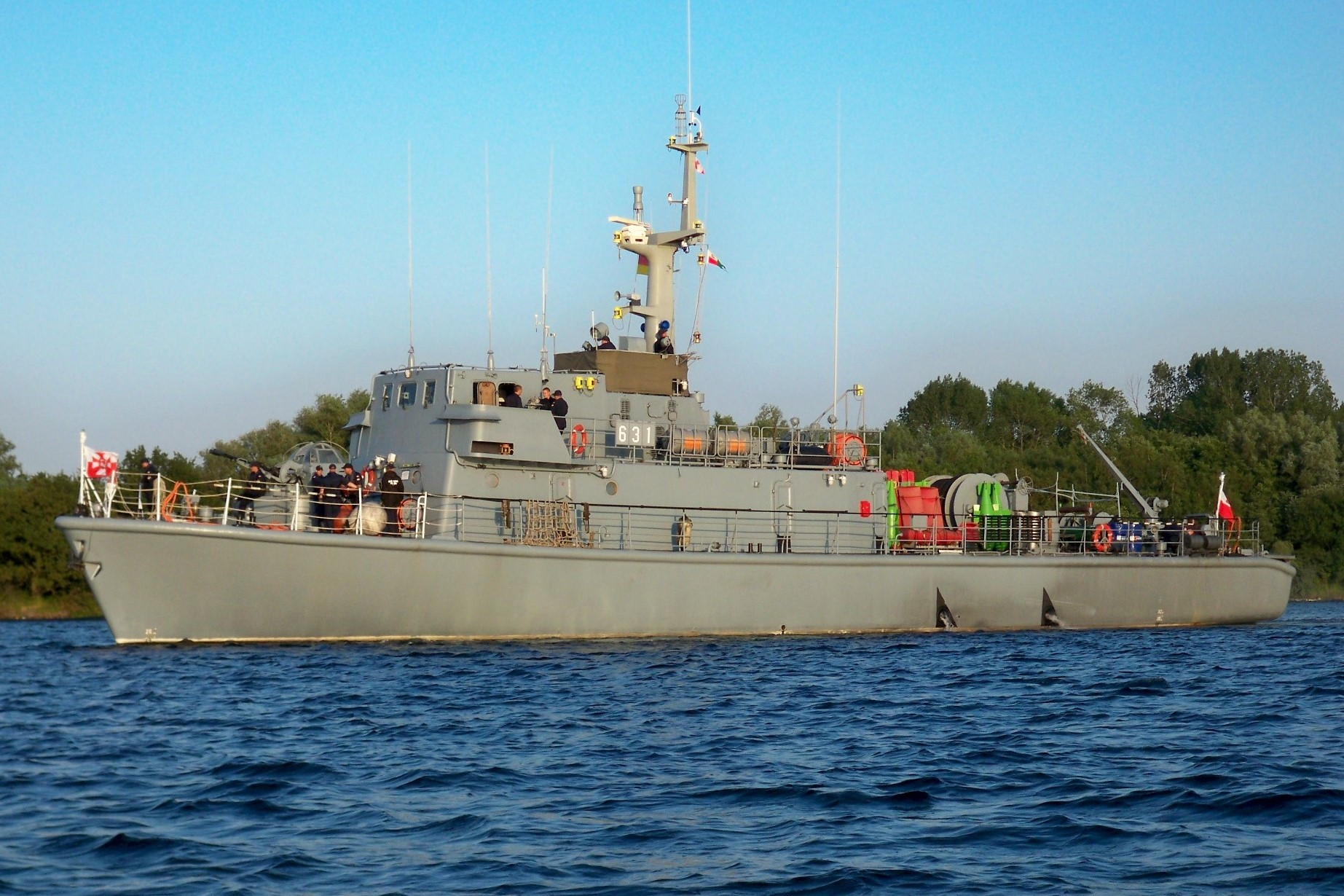
- Minesweeper ORP Gardno in 2013

History

Poland
- Name: ORP Gardno
- Builder: Polish Navy Shipyard, Gdynia
- Laid down: May 4, 1982
- Launched: June 23, 1983
- Commissioned: March 31, 1984

General characteristics
- Class & type: Gardno-class minesweeper
- Displacement: standard: 191 t (188 long tons); full: 206 t (203 long tons)
- Length: full: 38.47 m (126 ft 3 in); length between perpendiculars: 36.5 m (119 ft 9 in)
- Beam: 7.34 m (24 ft 1 in)
- Draft: 1.64 m (5 ft 5 in)
- Propulsion: 2 × M401 A1 diesel engines with a combined output of 2,000 hp; 2 propellers
- Speed: 14.6 kn (27.0 km/h; 16.8 mph)
- Range: 793 nautical miles at a speed of 14 kn (26 km/h; 16 mph)
- Crew: 30
- Sensors & processing systems: originally: MG-79 sonar; TRN-823 radar; Chrom-K identification friend or foe system; currently: Sperry Marine BridgeMaster E256/6 navigation radar; Sailor 5000 HF radio; EKD 500 HF receiver; Rohde & Schwarz VHF/UHF radio communication stations: M3SR, 440/RS, and 6115/2 Brzęczka; MG-89DSP hydroacoustic station
- Armament: originally: 2 × 25 mm 2M-3M twin automatic guns; 2 depth charge racks or 6–24 naval mines; currently: ZU-23-2MR Wróbel II artillery-missile system; 2 × PZR Grom short-range missile launchers; 2 mine rails for either 6 × wz. 08/39 (OS) mines or 24 × JaM mines; space for two racks of 24 depth charges (2 × 12)

ORP Gardno (631) is a Polish coastal minesweeper with a displacement of 191 tons, built during the Cold War as the first serial unit of the Gardno-class. Launched on 23 June 1983 at the Polish Navy Shipyard in Gdynia, the vessel was commissioned into the Polish Navy on 31 March 1984. Extensively used and bearing the hull number 631, ORP Gardno initially served with the 13th Minesweeper Squadron of the 9th Coastal Defence Flotilla in Hel, before being reassigned to the 12th Minesweeper Squadron of the 8th Coastal Defence Flotilla in Świnoujście. Over its long service, the ship has participated in numerous NATO and Polish Armed Forces counter-mine exercises and manoeuvres. As of 2018, ORP Gardno remains in active service with the Polish Navy.

== Design and construction ==
Conceptual work on a low-magnetic minesweeper began in the late 1960s under the Polish Navy Command. In 1968, the design specifications called for wooden hulls, inspired by the American Adjutant-class and British Ton-class and Ham-class minesweepers. However, the decision was soon made to use glass-reinforced plastic (GRP) laminates for the hull to reduce magnetic signatures. The vessels were designed to conduct contact and non-contact minesweeping in coastal and open waters of the Baltic Sea and North Sea, as well as to deploy small minefields and engage in anti-submarine warfare.

Design work for the Gardno-class minesweepers, codenamed Indyk, began in 1970 at the Design Office of Northern Shipyard and the Polish Navy Shipyard's Design Bureau. The chief designers were Eng. Roman Kraszewski, followed by Eng. Janusz Jasiński, with naval oversight by Captain Kazimierz Perzanowski. Constructing a large GRP hull posed challenges, leading to collaboration with the Shipbuilding Institute in Zagreb. A full-scale experimental hull section – a 35-ton block comprising two watertight compartments with a main engine, generator set, and equipment such as a davit, railings, trapdoors, and mine rails – was built and tested. (Note: The experimental block had a mass of 35 tons, a length of 9.81 m, a width of 6.72 m, and a height of 4.1 m (Ciślak (1995, p. 96); Janik (2013a, p. 27)).) In the late 1970s, with assistance from Yugoslav specialists, the block underwent underwater explosion resistance tests and measurements of electromagnetic fields emitted by onboard equipment.

In 1979, construction began on the experimental Gardno-class unit, later named ORP Gopło, based on a technical design from the Institute of Shipbuilding at Gdańsk University of Technology and Northern Shipyard's Design Office. Delivered to the Polish Navy in December 1981, it underwent a year of operational trials, after which the decision was made to build the prototype for the Gardno-class series, ORP Gardno.

ORP Gardno was constructed at the Polish Navy Shipyard in Gdynia (yard number 207P/2). Its keel was laid on 4 May 1982, though some sources cite 4 October 1982. The ship was launched on 23 June 1983 and handed over to the Polish Navy on 20 December 1983, with its ceremonial flag-raising on 31 March 1984. Named after Lake Gardno, the ship sponsor was Krystyna Fabisz. The construction cost in 1986 was 645 million PLN, including 115.6 million PLN in foreign currency (1.27 million rubles).

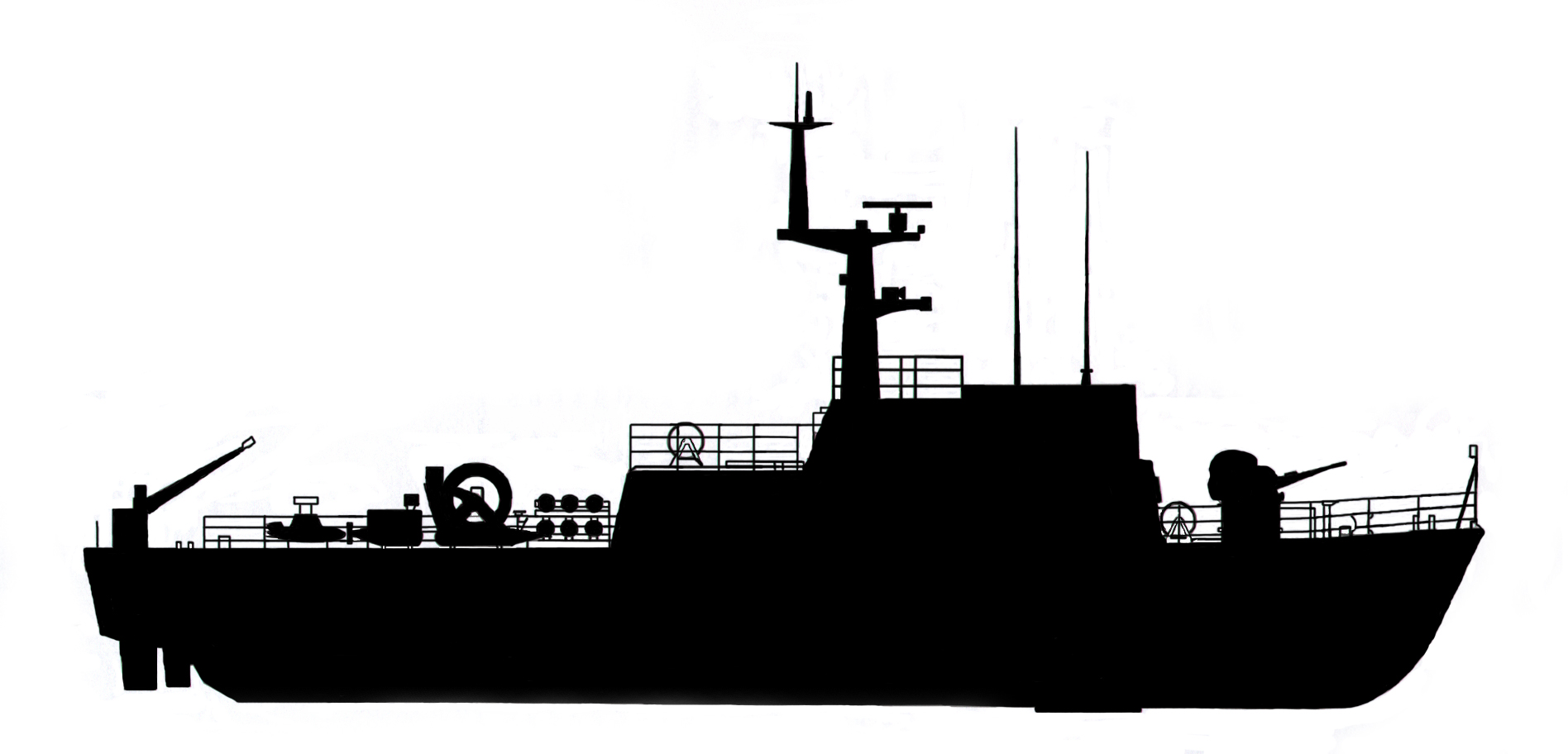
Silhouette of a Gardno-class minesweeper

== Technical specifications ==
ORP Gardno is a coastal minesweeper with an overall length of 38.47 metres (36.5 m between perpendiculars), a beam of 7.34 m, and an average draft of 1.64 m. Its freeboard height is 3.82 m. The hull, made of glass-reinforced plastic (GRP) laminates, consists of approximately 60% polyester resin (ANE D21M) and 40% glass fiber, including chopped strand mats and continuous roving fabrics. The plating thickness is 40 mm at the keel and mountings, 30–32 mm at the hull bottom's center, 25–28 mm elsewhere on the bottom and gunwales, and 22–23 mm on the deck. Eight watertight bulkheads (12–18 mm thick) divide the hull into nine watertight compartments, ensuring two-compartment unfloodability. The displacement is 191 tons standard, 199 tons normal, and 206 tons full load.

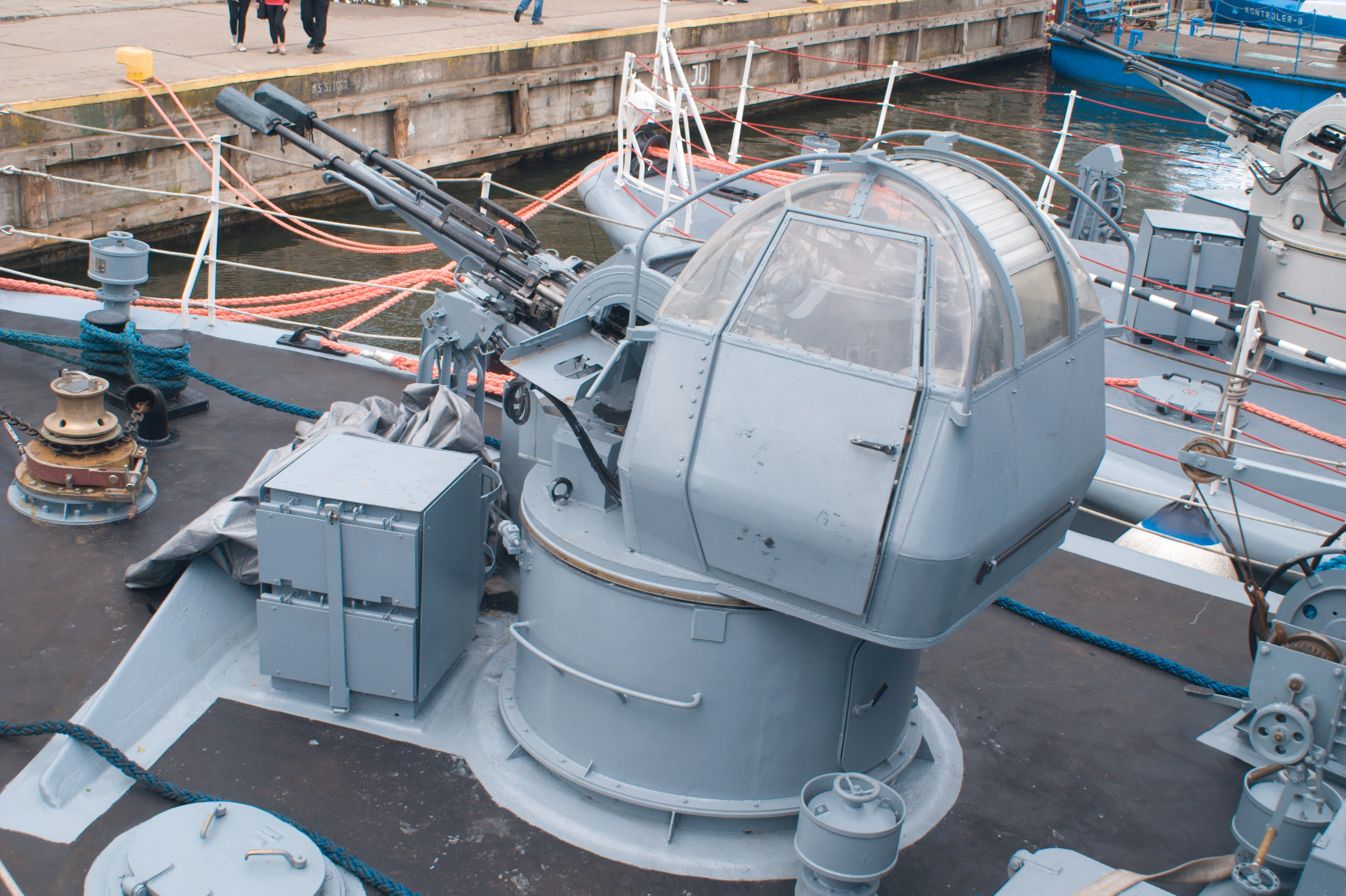
ZU-23-2M Wróbel gun mount on ORP Gardno

The ship is powered by two non-reversible, turbocharged, 12-cylinder, four-stroke diesel engines (Soviet-made M401 A1) in a V configuration, each producing 1,000 hp at 1,500 rpm. These drive two five-bladed propellers with fixed pitch, operating within fixed ducted propellers, via fluid coupling, SWV 25 reduction-reversing gears, and shafts. The propulsion system supports unattended operation. The maximum speed is 14.6 knots (10 knots economical), with a range of 793 nautical miles at 14 knots or 1,100 nautical miles at 9 knots, carrying 15.5 tons of fuel. Two partially balanced rudders (1.25 m² each) at the stern, controlled by a US 16TS2 steering engine, provide manoeuvrability. Electrical power comes from two 43ZPM-52H3 main generators (115 kVA each, three-phase 3×400 V/50 Hz, driven by 122 hp engines) and a 52H6 DC trawling generator (115 V). The ship carries 0.73 tons of oil, 3,000 litres of water, and 460 kg of provisions, enabling an autonomy of 5 days. It can perform minesweeping tasks at sea state 3 and wind force 4–5.

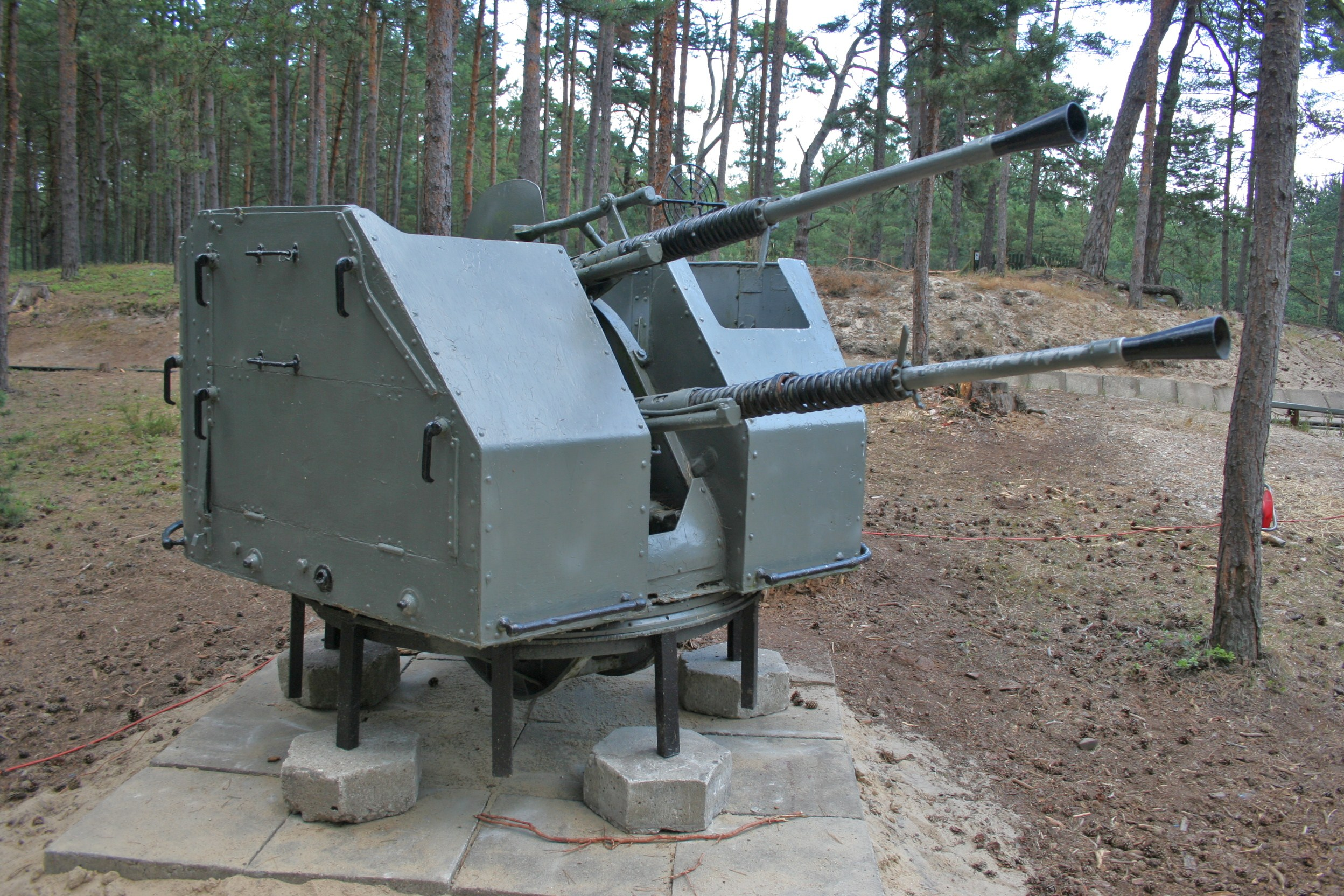
2M-3M 25 mm gun mount, originally fitted on ORP Gardno

Initially, the ship's armament included a twin autocannon 2M-3M (25 mm), mounted forward of the superstructure on the ship's centerline. It also has two deck-mounted mine rails, capable of carrying either six wz. 08/39 contact mines, 24 JaM-type mines, or two depth charge launchers with 24 B-1 rounds. Minesweeping equipment includes the MMTK-1 contact trawl, TEM-PE-1 magnetic trawl, and MTA-1 acoustic trawl. Electronic equipment originally comprised a Soviet MG-79 hull-mounted sonar (with S-3M gyro-stabilizer and POU-18 hoist), TRN-823 navigation radar, Chrom-K IFF system, R-625 VHF radio, R-615 HF radio, EKD 315 radio receiver, ARC-1402 direction finder, and Gałs positioning system. Additional equipment included launchers for four MDSz smoke candles, a GKU-2 gyrocompass, UKP-10M compass, 4301 echosounder, IEŁ-2M chip log, and FM 309/2 radiotelephone. The ship was fitted with air filtration and degaussing systems.

The crew consists of 30 personnel: 4 officers, 6 non-commissioned officers, and 20 sailors.

== Service ==
ORP Gardno, hull number 631, joined the 13th Minesweeper Squadron of the 9th Coastal Defence Flotilla in Hel, under its first commander, Lieutenant Marian Kazubek. In October 1985, it was transferred to the 12th Minesweeper Squadron of the 8th Coastal Defence Flotilla in Świnoujście. From 25 to 30 August 1995, ORP Gardno, alongside ORP Necko, ORP Nakło, and the tanker ORP Bałtyk, participated in Polish-Dutch exercises in the North Sea. Between 31 October and 6 November 1998, commanded by Lieutenant Commander Andrzej Wojtkowiak, it joined ORP Resko in the multinational Baltic Endeavour '98 counter-mine exercise. In 2000, the ship took part in Polish-German-French Baltica 2000 defence exercises (May), Open Spirit 2000 (5 September, clearing an approach to Riga port), and Baltic Endeavour 2000 in the Bay of Kiel (23–28 October, with ORP Jamno). From 9 to 13 October 2002, ORP Gardno, ORP Necko, ORP Nakło, and ORP Drużno conducted a counter-mine operation in the Bay of Pomerania with Danish ships (Passex 2002).

From 21 to 24 February 2005, ORP Gardno, with ORP Bukowo, ORP Dąbie, ORP Lublin, and the rescue ship ORP Semko, participated in Passex 2005, followed by Polish-German counter-mine exercises in the Bay of Pomerania on 7 March (with ORP Dąbie and ORP Sarbsko). On 4 May 2005, it joined ORP Dąbie, ORP Sarbsko, and ORP Kontradmirał Xawery Czernicki in German-French Baltica 2005 counter-mine manoeuvres. In September 2006, the ship participated in the Anakonda 2006 exercise. On 31 August 2007, Lieutenant Aleksander Urbanowicz became its commander. In December 2007, the Gdynia Naval Technology Branch contracted the Polish Navy Shipyard for a 31.5 million PLN overhaul of ORP Gardno, ORP Mielno, ORP Wicko, and ORP Nakło.

On 31 March 2009, during a shipyard overhaul, the crew celebrated the ship's 25th anniversary in the Polish Navy, attended by its ship sponsor, Krystyna Fabisz. In June 2011, ORP Gardno, ORP Nakło, and ORP Drużno joined BALTOPS 2011, followed by ORP Gardno, ORP Jamno, and ORP Mielno in BALTOPS 2012. In June 2013, it participated in BALTOPS alongside ORP Orzeł, ORP Kontradmirał Xawery Czernicki, ORP Gopło, ORP Mamry, ORP Wdzydze, ORP Bukowo, and ORP Hańcza. The ship also joined Polish Armed Forces exercises, including Wargacz-12 (May 2012) and Anakonda-12 (September 2012).

Over its service, the ship's armament and electronics were upgraded. In the mid-1980s, the 25 mm 2M-3M mount was replaced with a twin ZU-23-2M Wróbel anti-aircraft gun (1,592 rounds), and the TRN-823 radar was upgraded to an SRN-302. In the 2000s, most electronic equipment was replaced, and by 2012, it included an MG-79 sonar, BridgeMaster E256/6/N navigation radar, HF Sailor 5000, Rohde & Schwarz EK 896, EKD 300, and EKD 500 radios, and VHF Rohde & Schwarz XT M3SR 4400 and RS 6115/2 Brzęczka radios.

In March 2017, the Świnoujście Naval Port Command awarded a maintenance and docking contract to Nauta Shiprepair Yard (base cost 3.3 million PLN, optional 1.8 million PLN, two-year warranty). As of 2018, ORP Gardno remains in service, commanded by Lieutenant Bartłomiej Radwański since 3 November 2016.

== Bibliography ==
- Ciślak, Jarosław (1995). Polska Marynarka Wojenna 1995: okręty, samoloty i śmigłowce, uzbrojenie, organizacja [Polish Navy 1995: Ships, Aircraft and Helicopters, Armament, Organization] (in Polish). Warsaw: Lampart & Bellona. ISBN 83-86776-08-0.
- Janik, Janusz (2013). ""INDYK" z Gdyni. 30 lat trałowców projektu 207. Cz. 1" ["Indyk" from Gdynia: 30 Years of Project 207 Minesweepers, Part 1]. Morze, Statki i Okręty (in Polish). 1 (130). Magnum-X. ISSN 1426-529X.
- Janik, Janusz (2013). ""INDYK" z Gdyni. 30 lat trałowców projektu 207. Cz. 2" ["Indyk" from Gdynia: 30 Years of Project 207 Minesweepers, Part 2]. Morze, Statki i Okręty (in Polish). 2 (131). Magnum-X. ISSN 1426-529X.
- Serafin, Mieczysław (2008). Polska Marynarka Wojenna 1945–2007. Kronika wydarzeń [Polish Navy 1945–2007: Chronicle of Events] (in Polish). Gdynia: Zespół Redakcyjno-Wydawniczy Marynarki Wojennej. ISBN 978-83-88698-03-3.
