= 8th Coastal Defence Flotilla =

Coastal Defense Force of the Polish Navy

8th Coastal Defense Flotilla
- 8 Flotylla Obrony Wybrzeża
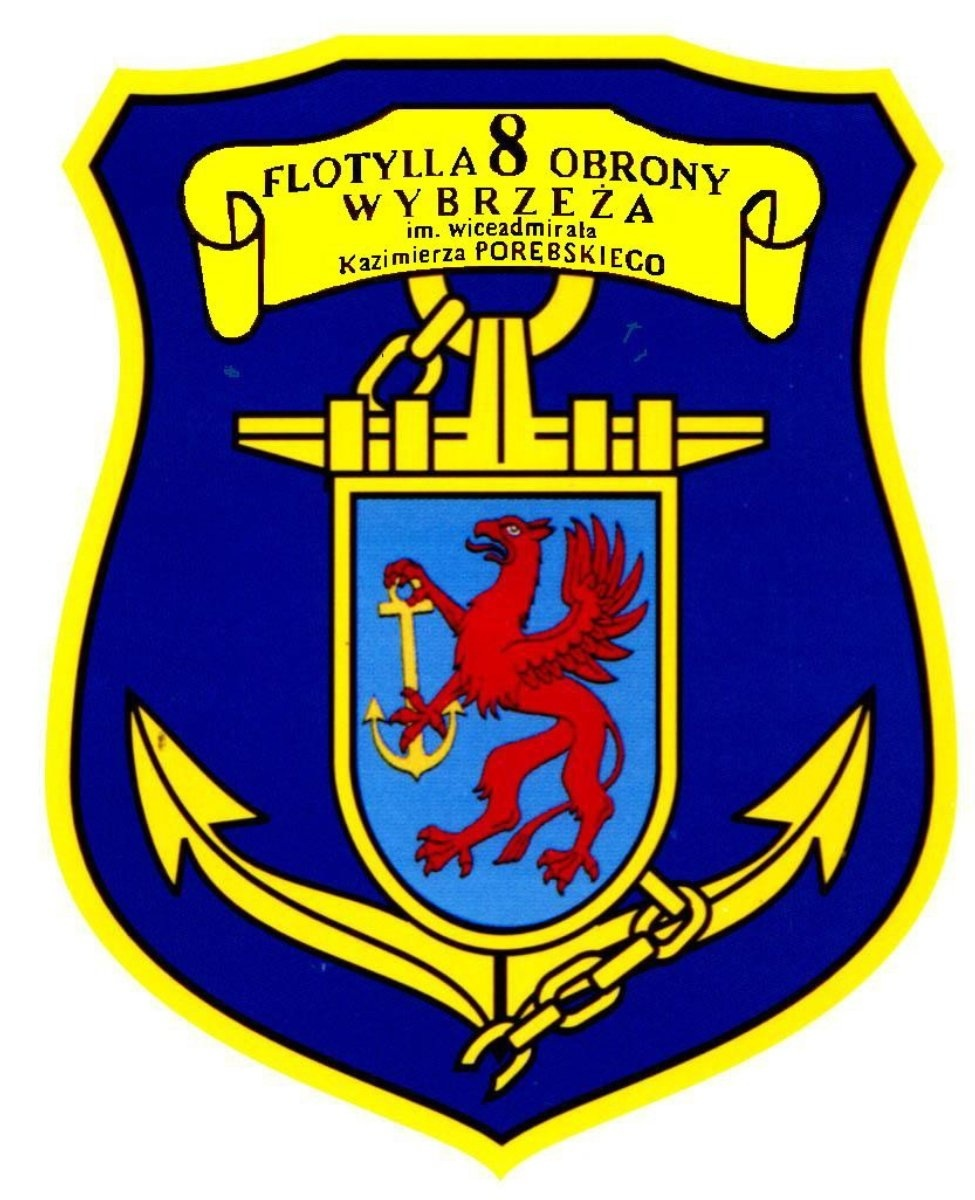
- 8th Coastal Defence Flotilla emblem
- Active: 1965 – present
- Country: Poland
- Branch: (Poland) Polish Navy
- Role: Fleet
- Part of: Armed Forces General Command
- Garrison/HQ: Świnoujście
- Anniversaries: 29 April
- Website: https://www.wojsko-polskie.pl/8fow/

Commanders
- Commander: Counter admiral Artur Kołaczyński

Insignia
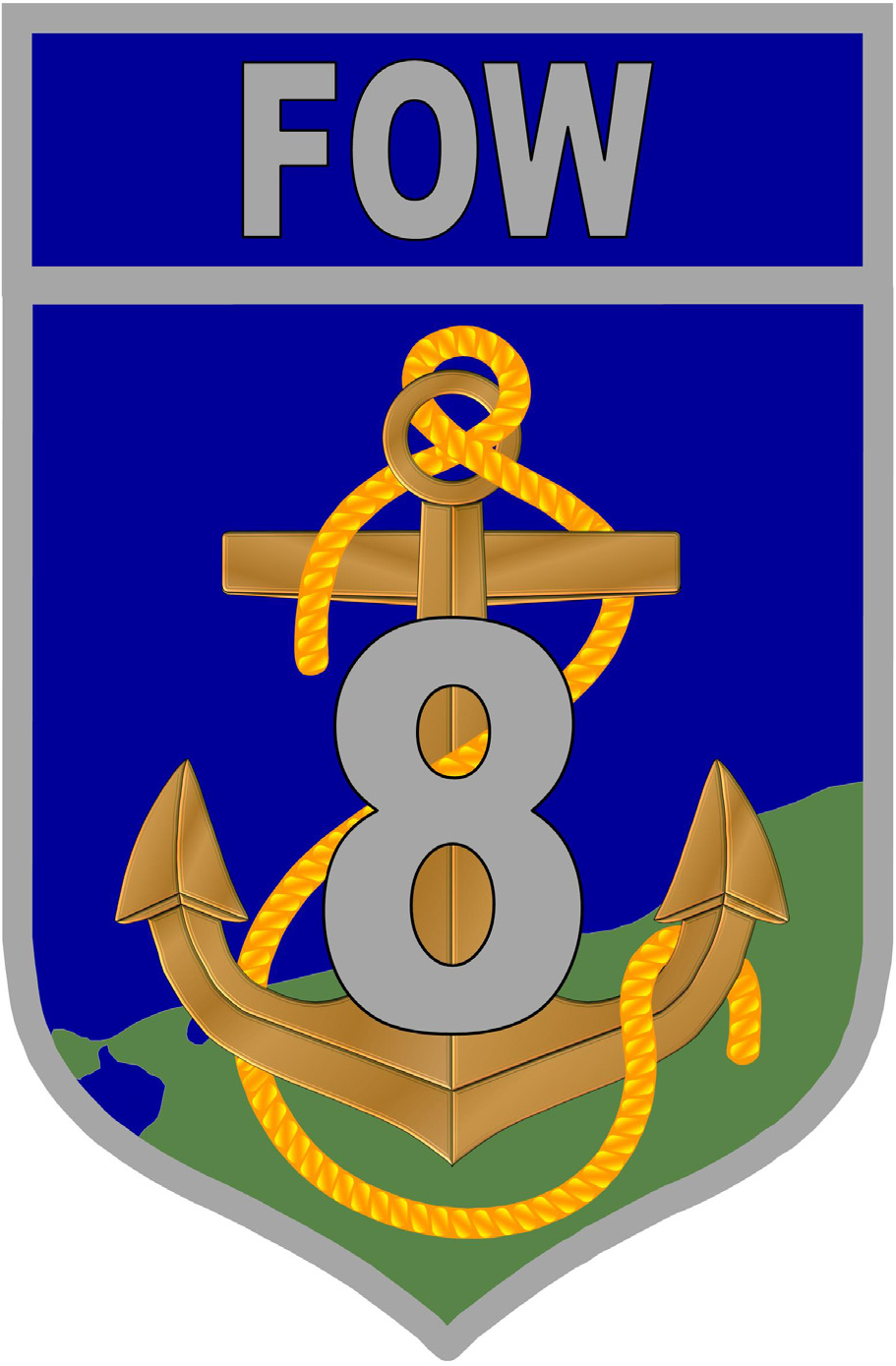
- 8 FOW Command shoulder sleeve insignia

The 8th Coastal Defense Flotilla (Polish: 8 Flotylla Obrony Wybrzeża (8 FOW) also known as 8th Coastal Defense Flotilla Vice admiral Kazimierz Porębski, a Polish navy fleet of coastal defense ships based in Świnoujście, one of the three naval groups of the Navy. The flotilla was established in 1965 at the main base of the Navy, previously the Szczecin Coastal Area. From January 1, 2014, the Flotilla was subordinated to the Armed Forces General Command.

== Overview ==
Difficulties in maintaining a relatively uniform and compact Flotilla in Świnoujście existed from the very beginning of its creation. In July 1949, Rear Admiral Włodzimierz Steyer, already as the commander of the Navy, came up with the concept of concentrating the main forces of the vessels in Gdynia, because completing, supplying and repairing the flotilla posed serious difficulties. The lack of ships and the development of new types of weapons, as well as changes in the international situation, combined with the reduction of the armed forces, forced the Navy's command to more realistically look for organizational solutions for its ships. Thus, the concept of naval bases and artillery protection of the coastal communication route by fixed and mobile artillery batteries was created. On December 21, 1950, the new unit was given the name of the Naval Base in Świnoujście and No. 2454. Commander Tadeusz Rutkowski was the first commander.

The establishment of the Navy Base is connected with the period of rapid development of watercraft. In 1951, the Landing Equipment Division was established, renamed the Landing Craft Division in 1956, and in 1964 into the 2nd Landing Ship Division, initially composed of 21 landing barges, 11 medium barges and 12 landing ships with a total displacement of 3,700 tons. In 1955, the 14th Tramp Cutter Division was transferred from Hel to Świnoujście. These ships took an active part in the sweeping of the Baltic waters of naval mines and other weapons remaining after the end of World War II.

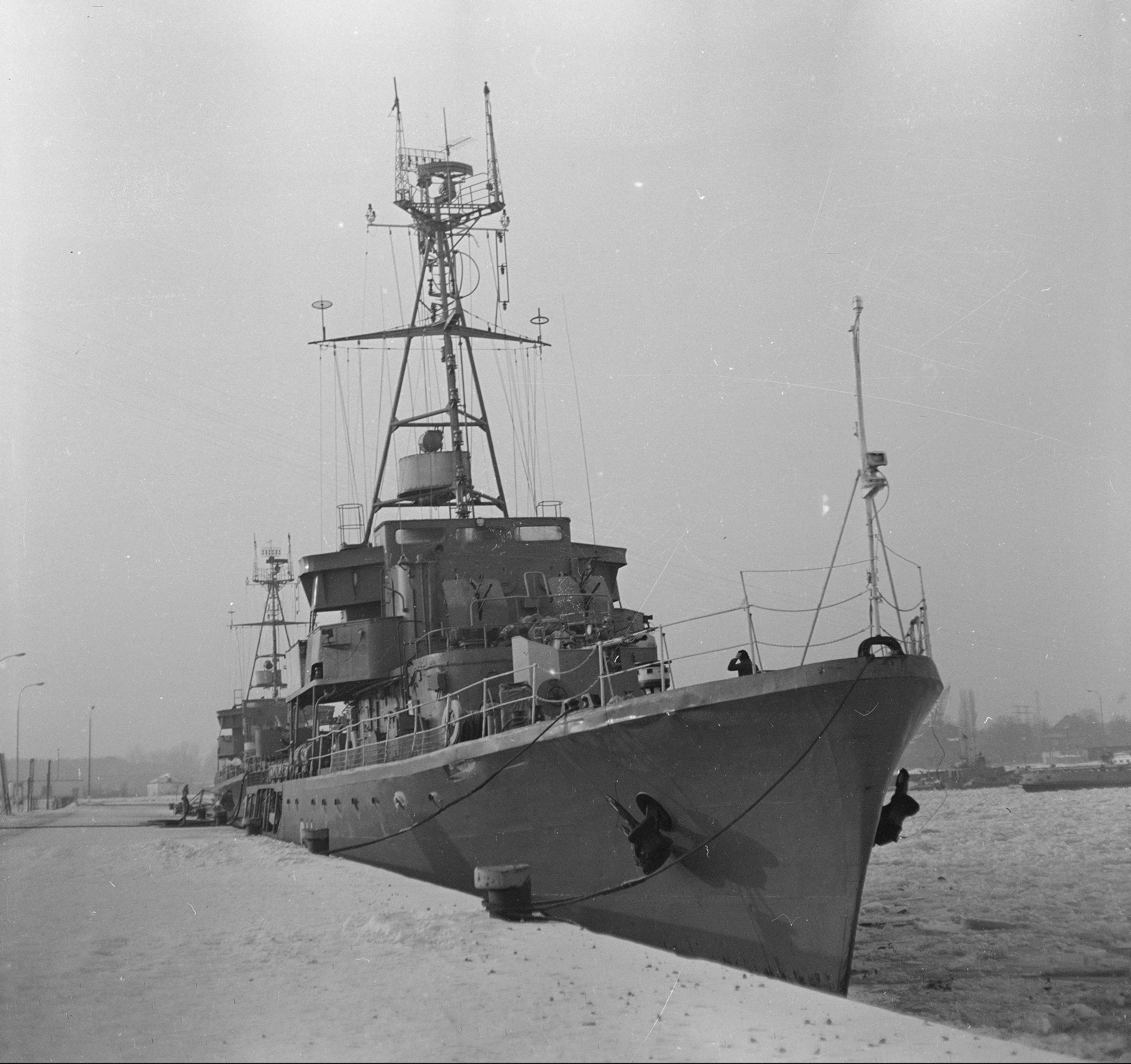
Project 254 minesweeper in Gdynia, February 1969

In May 1965, after the dissolution of the Navy Base in Świnoujście and its subordinate units, on the order of the commander, the 8th Coastal Defense Flotilla was established. In the same year, the 2nd Landing Ship Division and the 12th Minesweeper Division were created. The Command of the Naval Port was also restored, together with the Squadron of Auxiliary Floating Units and the Military Orchestra transferred from Ustka. The duties of the flotilla commander were entrusted to commander Zygmunt Rudomino. Initially, the main task of the Flotilla was to defend the Polish sea coast from the western border with Germany to the town of Jarosławiec, on the border with the second, newly formed 9th Coastal Defense Flotilla in Hel and the adjacent basin.

In 1977, the 8th Kołobrzeg Engineer Battalion was subordinated to the 8th Kołobrzeg Naval Combat Engineer Battalion and the 1st Marine Engineers Division was formed, which was subordinated to the 2nd Landing Ship Division. At its peak, the Flotilla consisted of about 80 vessels of various classes and coastal units. The dynamic development of the naval forces and coastal units of the Flotilla in this period resulted from the strategy and doctrine of the Armed Forces of the Polish People's Republic, implementing tasks within the then Warsaw Pact structures. The most eloquent example of this was the large participation of Flotilla ships in many operational-level exercises planned and organized by our navy, as well as the forces of the then allied Baltic Fleet and Volksmarine.

At the turn of the 1980s and 1990s, further structural and organizational changes took place. As a result of the ongoing socio-political transformation, changes in the doctrine of the Armed Forces and a new defense concept for the development of naval forces, there was a massive withdrawal of ships and landing ships. The effect of these transformations was the change of the name of the 2nd Landing Ship Division to the 2nd Landing and Minelaying Ships Division on July 12, 1992, and then its transformation into the 2nd Transport and Minelaying Ships Squadron on September 1, 1992. In the 1980s, the Project 254K and Project 254M minesweepers were withdrawn and replaced with the new Project 207D and 207P ships.

In June 1994, the 8th FOW was named after Vice Admiral Kazimierz Porębski. Also this year, by the decision of the Minister of National Defense, April 29 was declared the anniversary of the Flotilla. In 1995, after numerous staff and organizational changes, the 8th Coastal Defense Flotilla consisted of ships stationed in four towns: Świnoujście, Międzyzdroje, Dziwnów and Kołobrzeg.

== Organization ==
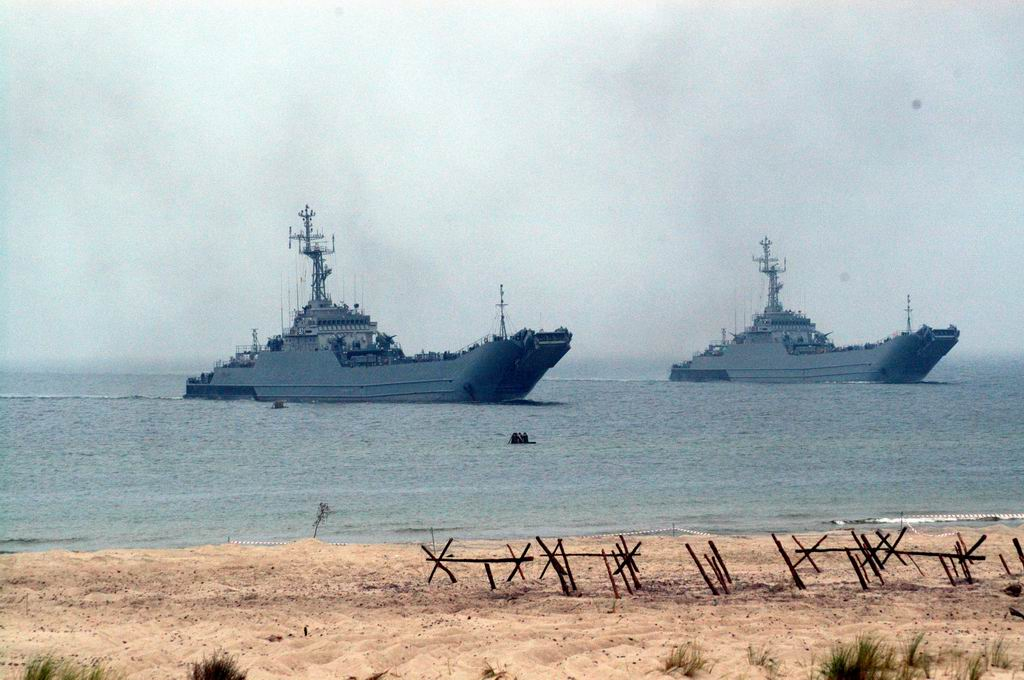
- Lublin-class minelayer-landing ships during Anakonda 2006
  Flotilla Command
- 8th Kołobrzeg Naval Combat Engineer Battalion (Dziwnów)
- Military Port Command Swinoujscie (Kołobrzeg)

=== 8th Anti-Aircraft Division (Dziwnów) ===
- Grom MANPADS
- ZU-23-2
- S-60 AAA guns

=== 2nd Landing and Minelaying Ships Division (Swinoujscie) ===
- Lublin-class minelayer-landing ship (5)
- Bereza-class degaussing ship (1)
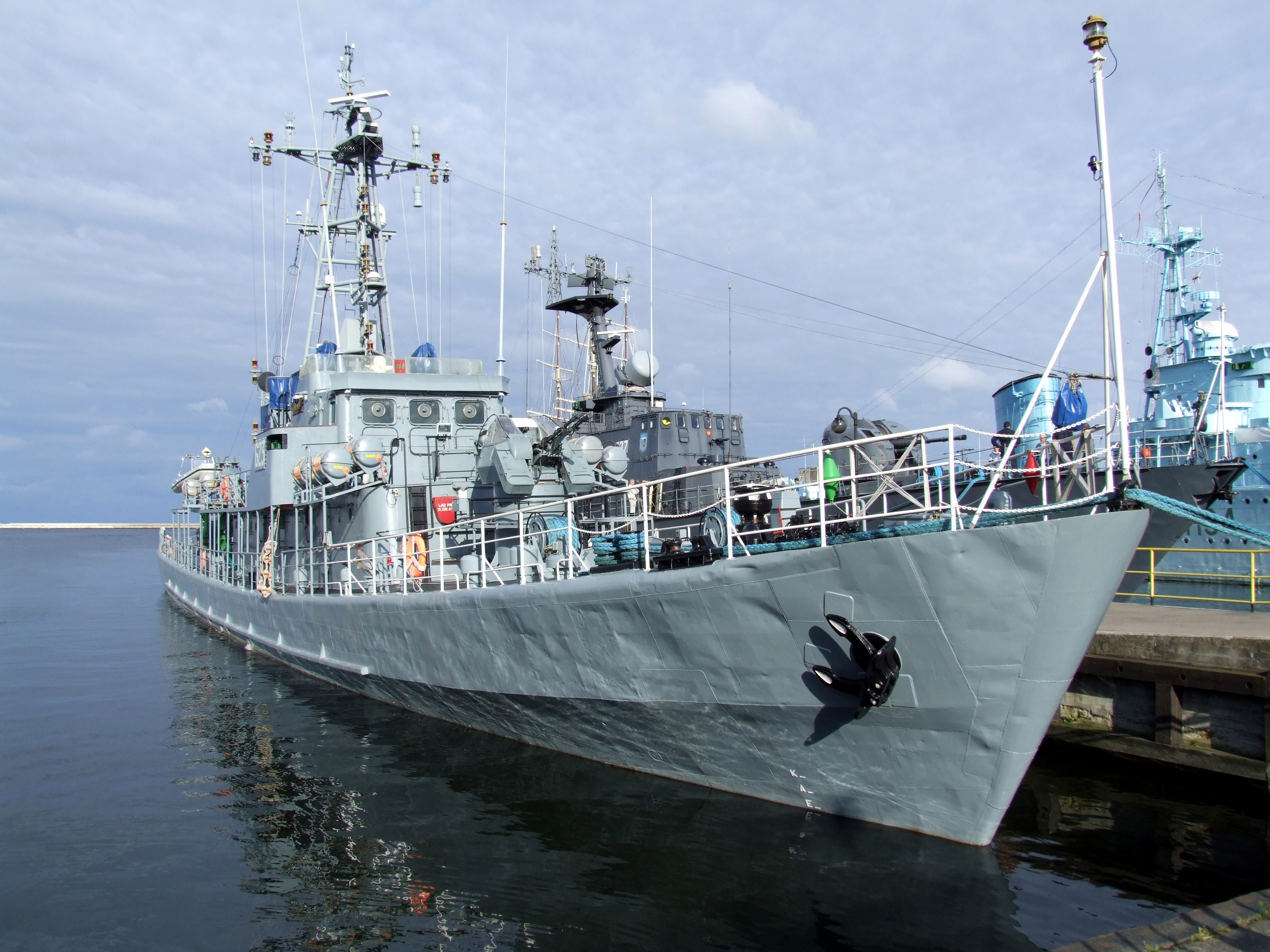
  ORP Mewa on 22 June 2007
- Project 716 transport ship (3)

=== 12th Wolin Minesweeper Division (Swinoujscie) ===
- Gardno-class minesweeper (12)
- Project B410-IV/S minesweeper (2)
- EOD Diver Group

=== 13th Minesweeper Division Fleet Admiral Andrzej Karweta (Gdynia) ===
- Kormoran II-class minehunter (1)
- Mamry-class minesweeper (5)
- EOD Diver Group

== Biography ==
- Lieutenant Commander Piotr Andrzejewski, MA, Lieutenant Comdr. MSc. Zygmunt Białogłowski, Capt. Mar. MSc. Tomasz Dolny, Comdr. Lt. Dr. Henryk Karwan, Capt. Mar. Eng. Janusz Królikowski, cadmium. Michał Michalski, Comdr. Lt. Dipl. Andrzej Walor. "Przegląd Morski" ed. April 2005 No. 4/2005
- Jarosław Ciślak Polish Navy 1995 - ships, planes and helicopters, weapons, organization.
- Website of the 8th Coastal Defense Flotilla
