= Gardno-class minesweeper =

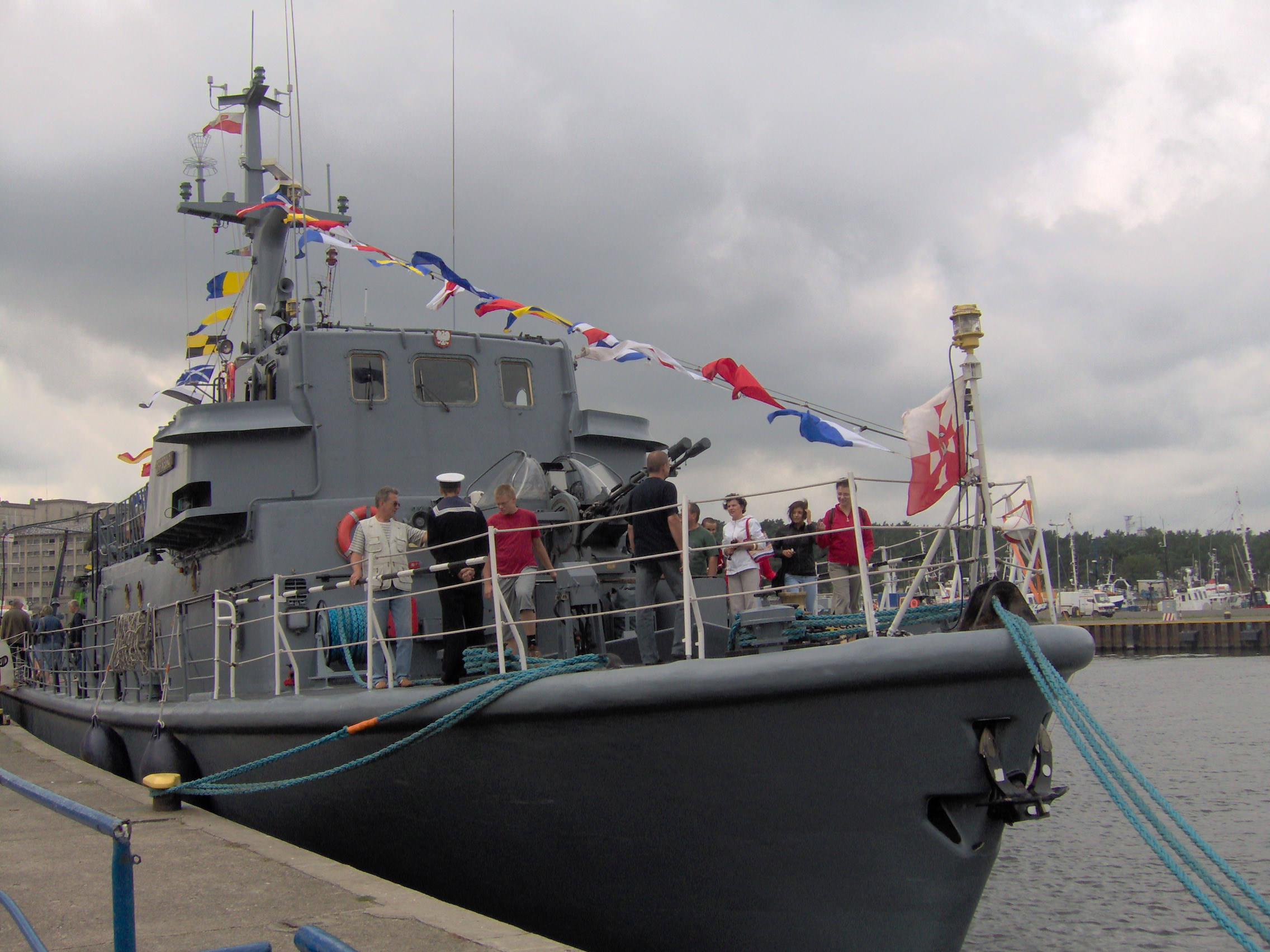
- ORP Resko, a Gardno-class minesweeper

Class overview
- Operators: Polish Navy
- Active: 12

General characteristics
- Displacement: 216 tons
- Length: 38.5 meters
- Speed: 14 knots
- Armament: 1 ZU-23-2M Minesweeping equipment Two 'Strela-2' MANPADS

The Gardno-class (Project 207) is a class of minesweepers in service with the Polish Navy. The ships are in commission since 1984.

== Ships in class ==
- ORP Gardno
- ORP Bukowo
- ORP Dąbie
- ORP Jamno
- ORP Mielno
- ORP Wicko
- ORP Resko
- ORP Sarbsko
- ORP Necko
- ORP Nakło
- ORP Drużno
- ORP Hańcza
