= ORP Bałtyk =

Polish Navy fleet tanker

OPR Bałtyk
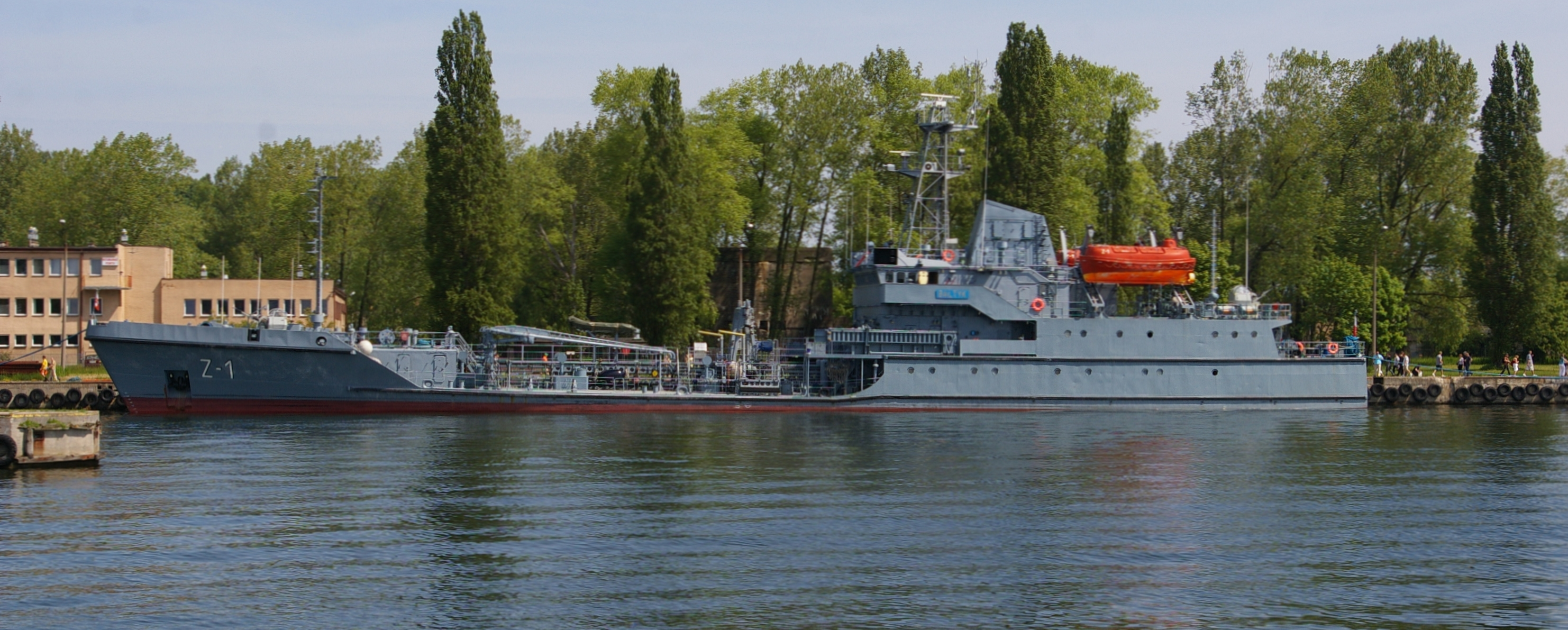
- OPR Bałtyk

History

Poland
- Builder: Stocznia Gdynia
- Launched: 1988
- Commissioned: 11 March 1991
- Identification: MMSI number: 261217000; Callsign: SRWM

General characteristics
- Displacement: 2,984 tons
- Length: 84.75 m (278 ft 1 in)
- Beam: 13.07 m (42 ft 11 in)
- Draft: 4.8 m (15 ft 9 in)
- Speed: 15 knots (28 km/h; 17 mph)
- Complement: 34+5
- Armament: 4 × ZU-23-2/ZU-23-2M anti-aircraft guns

Ensign of auxiliary naval vessels in Poland, used since 14 March 1996.

ORP Bałtyk is a fleet tanker of the Polish Navy. The ship was designed and built in the Stocznia Gdynia shipyard, Poland. She was launched in 1988 and commissioned on 11 March 1991.

In April 2016, the Polish Government launched a tender to replace the vessel with a new class to enter service between 2017 and 2020. The new vessel will be required to store 1,500 tonnes of fuel, 200 tonnes of water as well as up to three twenty foot shipping containers.
