= Polish Navy Shipyard =

Naval shipyard in Poland

Coordinates: 54°32′28″N 18°32′00″E

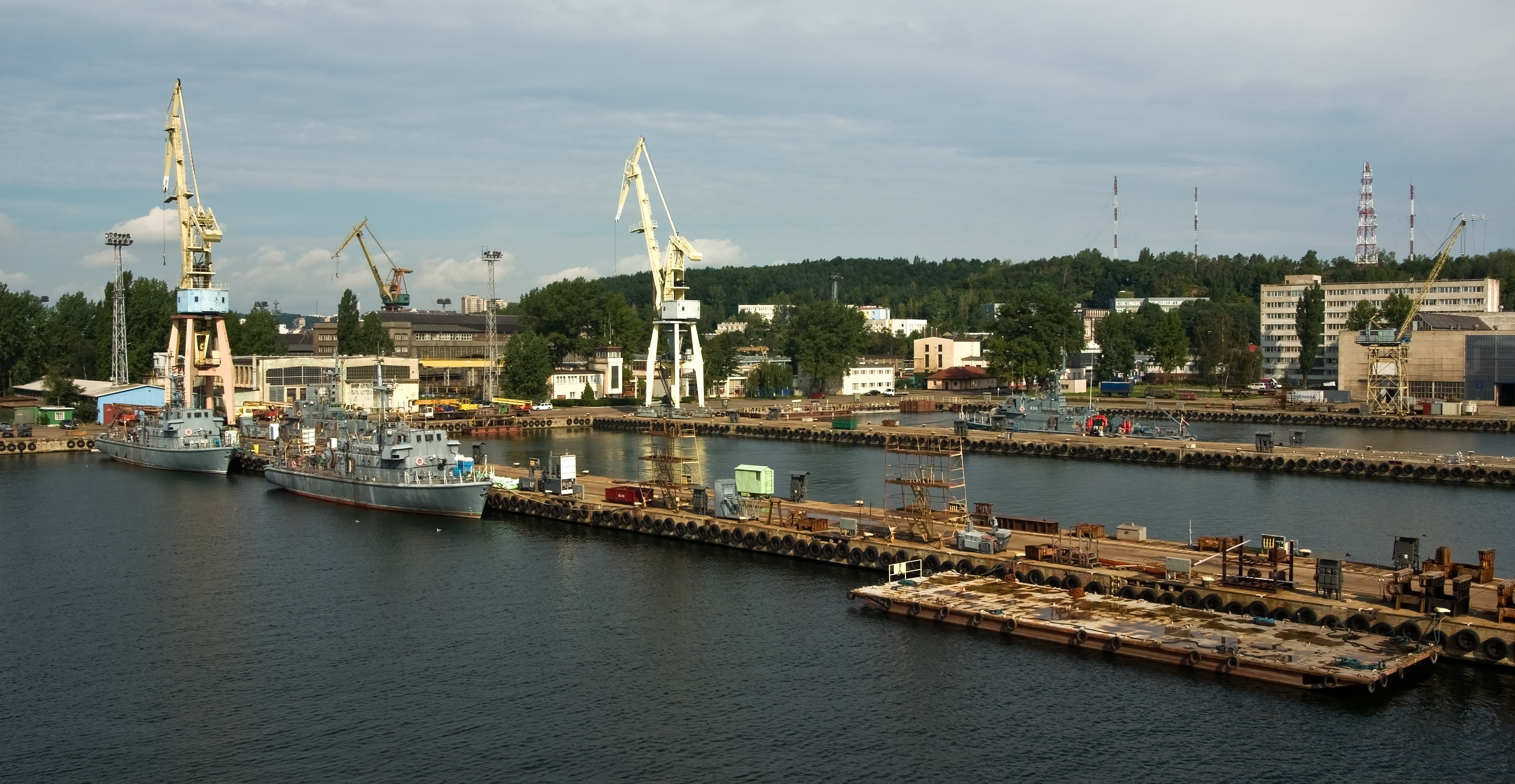
Polish Navy Shipyard, 2008.

Polish Navy Shipyard (Polish: Stocznia Marynarki Wojennej) is a Polish shipyard located in Gdynia. It is the oldest operating shipyard in Poland.

The first Polish shipyard on the Baltic Sea after regaining independence was established on May 10, 1922, as a result of moving the Naval Port Workshops (Warsztaty Portowe Marynarki Wojennej) from Modlin to Puck. At that time, repairs were mainly made to warships stationed in the Puck naval base. After the relocation of the naval base to Gdynia, the same was done in 1927 with the Naval Port Workshops. In the 1930s, the shipyard infrastructure was significantly expanded. During the Second World War the war activities largely destroyed the shipyard, and before withdrawing, the Germans looted or destroyed what could still be used, as was the case with other industrial facilities in the occupied lands. After the war, a long process of reconstruction began. The rebuilt shipyard resumed operations as the Navy Shipyard (Stocznia Marynarki Wojennej). and after the System Transformation in 1989, it was commercialized but financial problems led the shipyard to bankruptcy in 2009.

In 2017, the Polska Grupa Zbrojeniowa took over the bankrupt shipyard from the bankruptcy trustee. As a result of transaction, a new entity called PGZ Stocznia Wojenna was established. In 2022, a program of deep reconstruction and modernization of the shipyard began, under which new halls with CNC plasma cutting machines will be built, in which work will be largely automated. As of 2023, the shipyard operates profitably and is responsible for the implementation of the main shipbuilding programs of the Polish Navy.
