= ORP Kontradmirał Xawery Czernicki =

Polish Navy ship

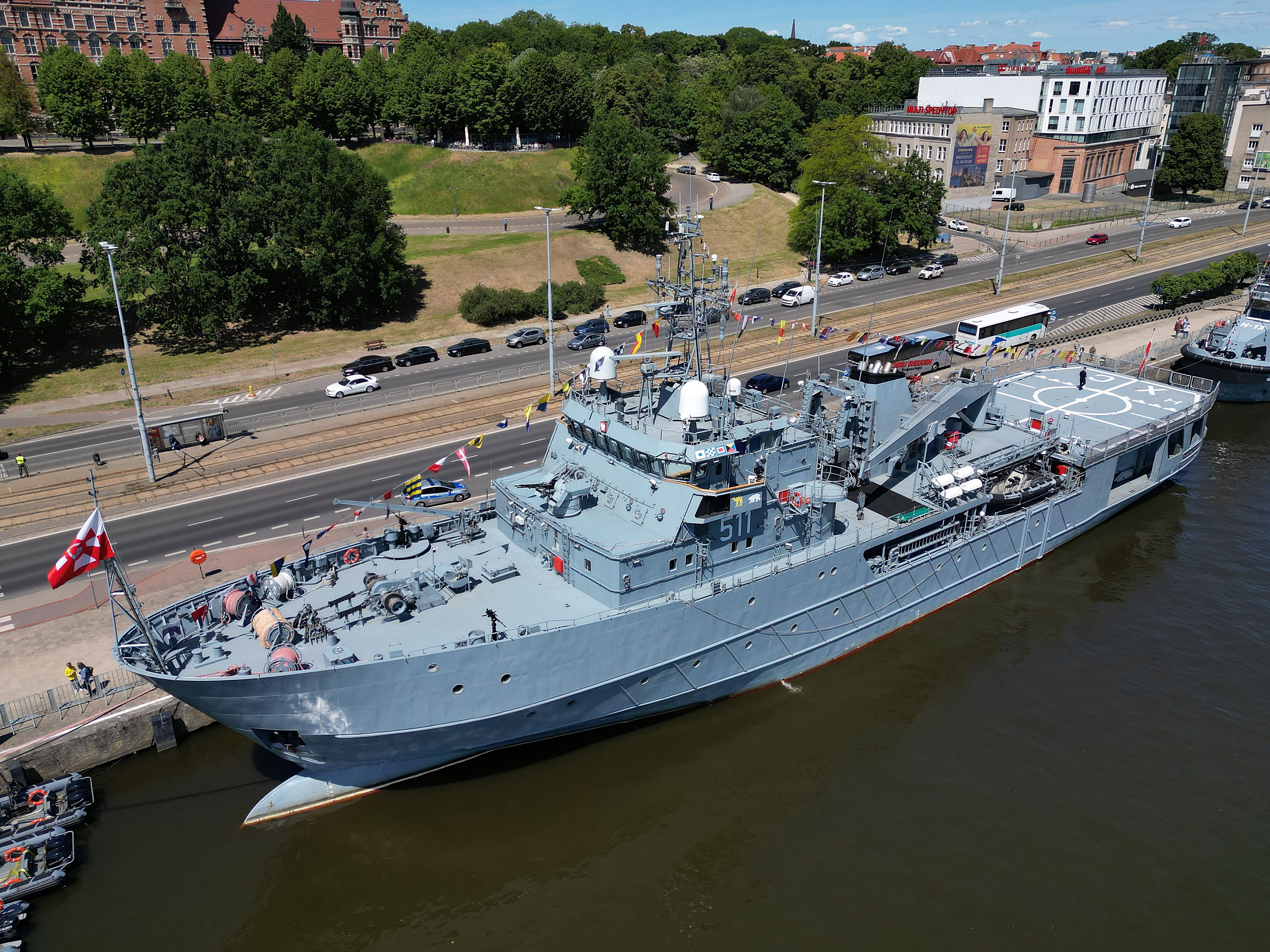
- ORP Kontradmirał Xawery Czernicki

History

Poland
- Name: ORP Kontradmirał Xawery Czernicki
- Namesake: Xawery Czernicki
- Builder: Northern Shipyard; Gdańsk
- Laid down: August 16, 2000
- Launched: November 16, 2000
- Commissioned: September 1, 2001
- Status: Active service
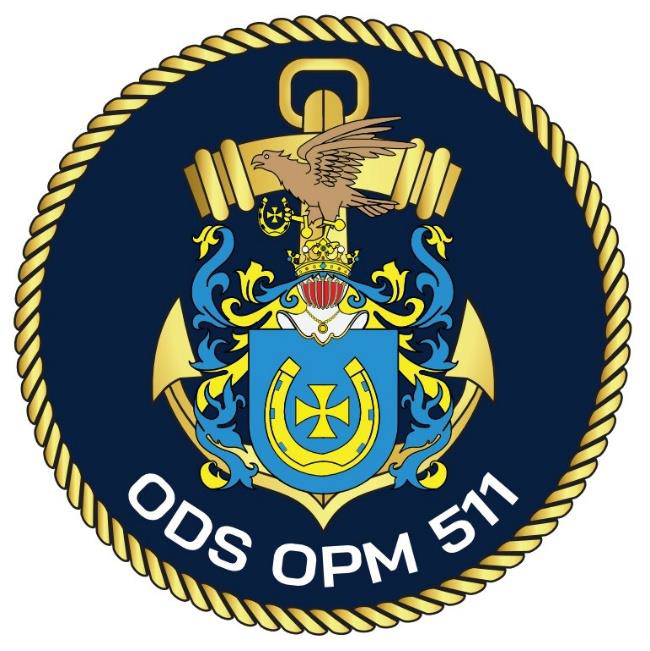
- Badge

General characteristics
- Displacement: 2,390
- Length: 73.8 m (242 ft 2 in)
- Beam: 13.8 m (45 ft 3 in)
- Draft: 5.6 m (18 ft 4 in)
- Speed: 14.1 knots (26.1 km/h/16.2 mph)
- Armament: 1 × short range anti-aircraft complex ZU-23-2MR Wróbel-II; 1 × II 23 mm (0.91 in) cannon with 1xII Strela 2M missile launcher)

ORP Kontradmirał Xawery Czernicki is a mine countermeasure forces command vessel of the Polish Navy. The ship's design was based on a hull of the 130 class degaussing station planned by the Construction Bureau of the Refurbishing Shipyard in Gdańsk. The hull was ordered by the Russian Navy, but the contract was halted and it was decided to complete the ship for the Polish Navy. She was named after Rear Admiral (Polish: kontradmirał) Xawery Czernicki. The name is often written in a short form Kontradmirał X. Czernicki, even on the vessel's boards.

The ship was built at the Northern Shipyard in Gdańsk and is the biggest to have been built for the Polish Navy in a Polish shipyard. The only ship of her class, she was designed as a logistical support vessel, to transport troops and supplies for the NATO forces worldwide, and to cooperate with air transport and Polish vessels in distant seas. She can carry up to 140 troops with vehicles, food and equipment, and can conduct offensive landing operations using landing ships, helicopters and armoured personnel carriers, as well as evacuating of troops and civilians. The ship can transport containers, fresh water, food and other supplies, and repair other vessels at open seas.

Czernicki took part in the Afghan and Iraq wars. During operation Enduring Freedom she joined the United States Fifth Fleet in the Indian Ocean. After change of crew, she took part in the Iraq invasion, patrolling the Euphrates estuary and serving as a floating base for commando operations.

After the conclusion of the invasion she returned to home port in Poland for refit and upgrades.
