= ORP Ślązak =

There were several ships of the Polish Navy bearing the name of ORP Ślązak (Polish: Silesian):

- ORP Ślązak (1921), an A56-class torpedo boat serving with the Polish Navy between 1921 and 1937, a former German A-59
- ORP Ślązak (L26), a Hunt-class destroyer serving during the World War II
- ORP Ślązak (1954), an M-XV-class (build 96) submarine built in the Soviet Union and commissioned in 1954.
- ORP Ślązak (2015) is a Gawron-class corvette, commissioned in November 2019 and in active service.
