= List of Polish admirals =

Polish admirals flag

The following is a list of Polish officers holding the rank of admiral, as well as generals serving in the Polish Navy. Prior to 1918 the term admirał (and, consistently, wiceadmirał and kontradmirał) referred to a function held in the navy rather than a military rank as such.

== Until 1918 ==
- Ellert Appelman (Note: A Dutchman in Polish service) (See surname Appelman in Swedish Wikipedia).
- admiral Wilhelm Appelman
- admiral Arend Dickmann
- admiral Grzegorz Fentross, probably Gregorio Venturoso (Note: A Spaniard in Polish service)
- admiral Johan Nilsson Gyllenstierna (Note: A Swede in Polish service) also Jan Guldenstern - see Gyllenstierna/Gyldenstjerne/Guldenstern in English, Polish, and Swedish Wikipedia.
- admiral Tonnson Maidel
- admiral Michał Starostka, (also Michał Starosta) first Pole to be appointed admiral (1571), he was ennobled and entitled to Starostka coat-of-arms (1569).
- admiral Herman Witte
- vice-admiral Aleksander Sitton (Note: A Dane in Polish service)
- rear-admiral Jakub Murray (Note: A Scotsman in Polish service)
- admirał Michał Starosta

== 1918–1939 ==
- generał brygady Tadeusz Bobrowski, chief of the Technical Service of the Directorate of Navy in the Ministry of National Defence
- kontradmirał Xawery Czernicki, chief of services and deputy commander of the Navy
- wiceadmirał Kazimierz Porębski, chief of the Naval Affairs Department of the Ministry of Military Affairs
- wiceadmirał Jerzy Świrski, commander of the Navy
- wiceadmirał Józef Unrug, deputy commander of the Navy

== World War II ==
- generał brygady Stanisław Dąbek (Note: Promoted posthumously), commander of the Coastal Land Defence units
- kontradmirał Stefan Frankowski, commander of the Coastal Sea Defence units
- kontradmirał Tadeusz Morgenstern-Podjazd (Note: Promoted upon retirement), deputy commander of the Navy
- kontradmirał Romuald Nałęcz-Tymiński, commanding officer of ORP Conrad
- kontradmirał Józef Bartosik
- kontradmirał Karol Korytowski
- kontradmirał Leon Moszczyński
- kontradmirał Jerzy Tumaniszwili

== 1945–1989 ==
- kontradmirał Mikołaj Abramow (Nikolai Abramov - commander of the Navy) (Note: A Russian in Polish service), commander of the Navy
- wiceadmirał Wiktor Czerokow (Viktor Cherokov), commander of the Navy
- kontradmirał Adam Mohuczy, deputy commander of the Navy
- kontradmirał Włodzimierz Steyer, commander of the Navy
- kontradmirał Iwan Szylingowski (Ivan Shillingovskiy), chief of general staff and deputy commander of the Navy
- kontradmirał Aleksander Winogradow (Aleksandr Vinogradov) – dowódca Marynarki Wojennej

== After 1989 ==
- admirał floty Roman Krzyżelewski (Note: In active service (as of 2005)), commander of the Polish Navy
- Roman Krzyżelewski, commander of the Polish Navy 2003 to 2007
- kontradmirał Jerzy Tumaniszwili, a World War II hero
- admirał floty Tomasz Mathea, commander of the Polish Navy from 2010 to 2015
- wiceadmirał Andrzej Karweta, commander of the Polish Navy from 2007 to 2010.
