= Captain Clark =

Captain Clark may refer to:

- Joseph J. Clark
- Pirate Clark, character from 2026 film Backrooms
