= J. J. Clark =

J. J. Clark may refer to:

- John James Clark (1838–1915), often known as J. J. Clark, Australian architect
- Joseph J. Clark (1893–1971), often known as J. J."Jocko" Clark, Admiral of the U.S. Navy in World War II
