= Jeliński =

Jeliński is a Polish masculine surname, its feminine counterpart is Jelińska. The surname may refer to the following notable people:

- Frank Jelinski (born 1958), German racing driver
- Marian Jeliński (born 1949), Polish academic
- Michał Jeliński (born 1980), Polish rower
