= 28th Naval Aviation Squadron =

- Active: 2003 – 2010
- Country: Poland
- Branch: Polish Navy
- Type: Naval Aviation Squadron
- Role: SAR, Transport, Reconnaissance
- Size: Squadron

Aircraft flown
- Cargo helicopter: Mi-8T
- Utility helicopter: Kaman SH-2G, PZL W-3A
- Reconnaissance: PZL M-28B

28th Naval Aviation Squadron (28 Pucka Eskadra Lotnicza) was the Polish Navy's air wing supporting naval operations. The unit was stationed in Gdynia-Babie Doły military airport. The unit operated various utility helicopters, mostly in Search and Rescue variants.

In 2003 the 1st Naval Aviation Squadron transferred into 28th Squadron (Navy) based at Gdynia Babie Doly

The 28th Squadron had the following flights designated to different tasks:

- SAR Flight (equipped with W-3RM Anakonda):
- Transportation flight (equipped with Mi-17, W-3T Sokol, An-28 and M28B-1TD):
- ASW Flight (equipped with SH-2G Seasprites):

In 2010 the unit was disbanded. Its personnel and equipment was transferred to the newly formed 43rd Naval Aviation Base.
