= Siemirowice =

- Village
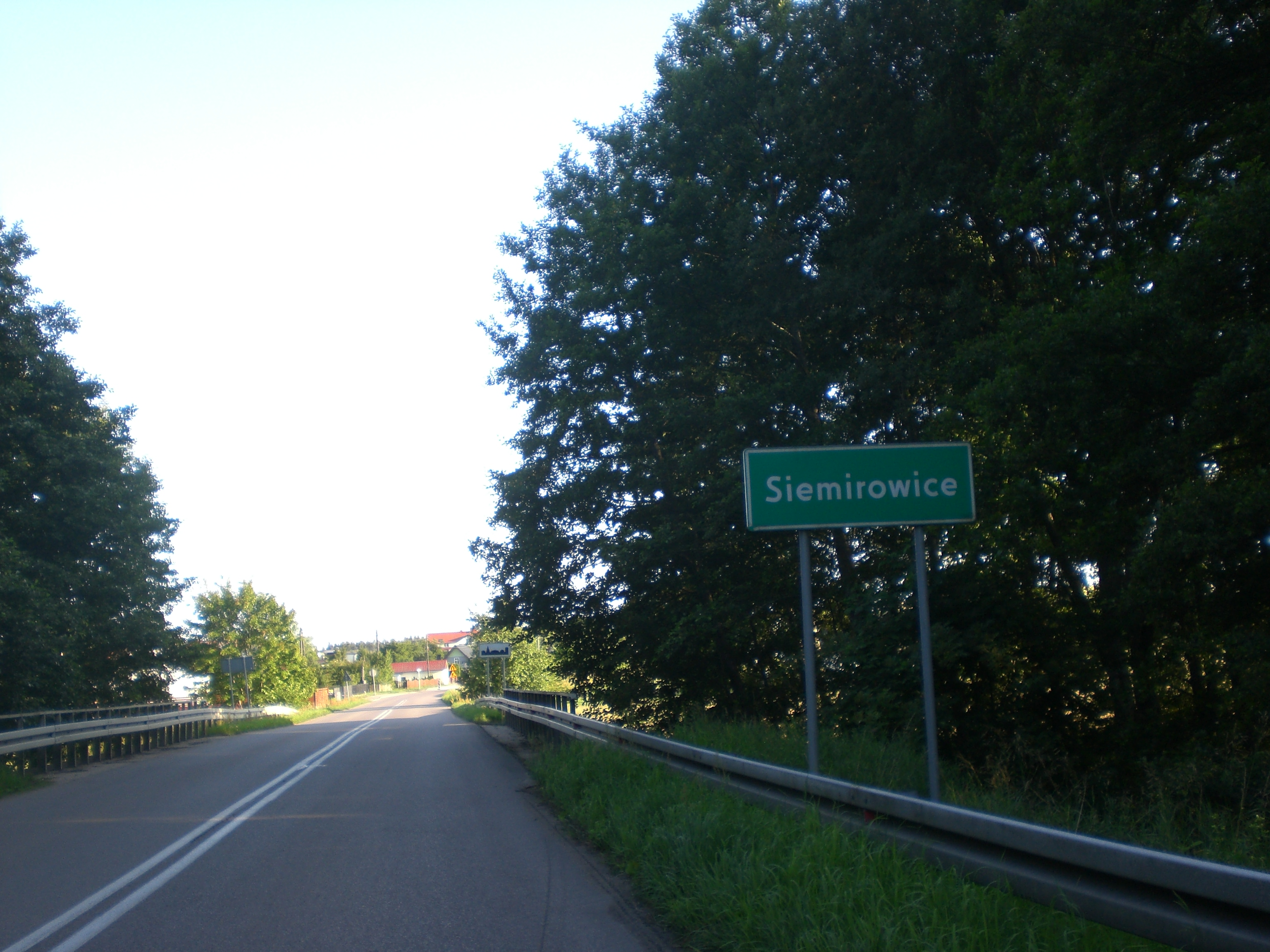

- Location within Poland
- Coordinates: 54°24′N 17°45′E
- Country: Poland
- Voivodeship: Pomeranian
- County: Lębork
- Gmina: Cewice
- Population: 4,200
- Time zone: UTC+1 (CET)
  - Summer (DST): UTC+2 (CEST)
- Vehicle registration: GLE
- Website: http://www.siemirowice.pl

Siemirowice [ɕɛmirɔˈvit͡sɛ] (German: Schimmerwitz) is a village in the administrative district of Gmina Cewice, within Lębork County, Pomeranian Voivodeship, in northern Poland. It is located in the ethnocultural region of Kashubia in the historic region of Pomerania.

The 44th Naval Air Base of the Polish Navy is based in Siemirowice.

== Sights ==
In a forest near Siemirowice there is a barrow cemetery.

== Education ==
There is a small school in Siemirowice. Students aged 6 to 12 years attend it. They learn three additional languages - Kashubian, English and German.

== Notable people ==
- Marian Jeliński (1949-), an apiologist and Kashubian activist
