= USS Pulaski =

One United States Navy ship has borne the name Pulaski, after Casimir Pulaski. Another ship has borne the name Casimir Pulaski. This ship is sometime incorrectly referred to as USS Pulaski. There was yet another USN ship which contained the word Pulaski.

Named for Casimir Pulaski

- USS Pulaski (1854)
- USS Casimir Pulaski (SSBN-633)

Named for place which was named to honor Casimir Pulaski

- USS Pulaski County (LST-1088)

== See also ==
- ORP Generał Kazimierz Pułaski, a Polish Navy frigate
- SS Pulaski, an ocean liner for the then Russian American Line before World War I, which operated under several names
- Steamship Pulaski disaster, which occurred off North Carolina in 1838
- Pulaski (disambiguation)
