= Tomasz Mathea =

Polish Navy admiral of the fleet

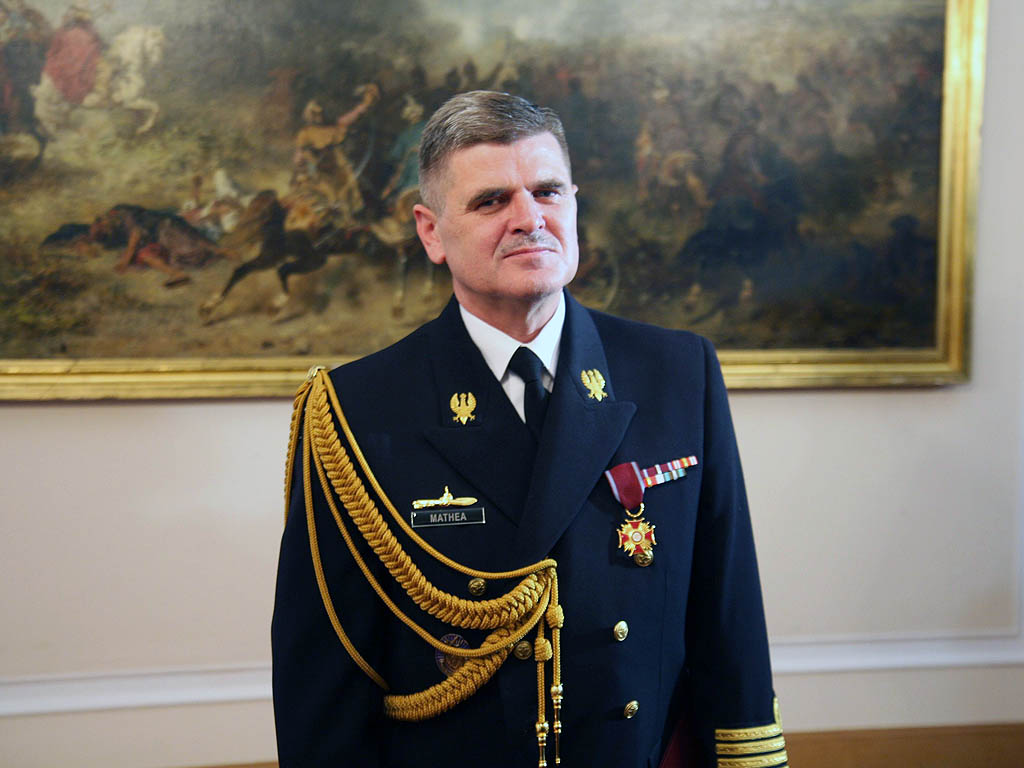
- Mathea in 2010
- Born: 30 April 1955 (age 71); Warsaw, Poland
- Allegiance: Poland
- Branch: Polish Navy
- Rank: Vice Admiral
- Commands: Commander of the Polish Navy (2010–2014)
- Alma mater: Higher Naval School

Tomasz Mathea (born 30 April 1955) is a retired Polish vice admiral who served as Commander of the Polish Navy from 2010 to 2014.

== Early life and education ==
Tomasz Mathea was born on 30 April 1955 in Warsaw, Poland. In 1974, he began studies at the Higher Naval School in Gdynia.

He completed postgraduate studies at the Naval Academy of the USSR in Leningrad (1988), the Royal Academy of Naval Staff of the United Kingdom in London (1995), the National Defence Academy in Warsaw (1996) and the National Defense University of the United States of America in Washington, DC (2003).

== Military service ==
In 1980 he was sent to Submarine Squadron 3 Flotilla in Gdynia, where he served on submarines Project 613, first as commander of the department of underwater weapons ORP "Sokol", and from 1984 Deputy Commander of ORP "Bald Eagle". In 1988 he became Chief of Staff of Submarine Squadron. From 1991 to 1994 he commanded Submarine Squadron, and in 1995 became a senior specialist in the Navy's Department of Operational Staff. In 1996 he became deputy commander for training in 3rd Ship Flotilla. In the period 1998 - 2000, he served as Chief of Maritime Training - Deputy Chief of Navy Training. From mid-2000 he commanded the 9th Coast Defense Flotilla in Hel and in 2003 he became head of the General Directorate of Strategic Planning P-5 in the General Staff of the Polish Army. From 2004 to 2006 he was head of Naval Logistics, after which he was appointed deputy chief of the General Staff of the Polish Army.
