= Olga Clark =

Russian socialite (1898–1994)

- Born: Olga Evgenyevna Choubaroff/Chubarova; September 23, 1898; Tbilisi, Russian Empire
- Died: 24 April 1994 (aged 95); New York City, New York, U.S.
- Other names: Princess Chagodalf
- Spouses: Chagodaef (m. 1920-???; his death); José Raúl Capablanca (m. 1938-1942; his death); Kristopher Alonz(o?) (m. 1959-???); Joseph J. Clark (m. 1967-1971; his death)

Olga Clark (September 23, 1898 – 24 April 1994) was a socialite and self-proclaimed princess from Russia who spent most of her life in the United States. She was married four times, including to world chess champion José Raúl Capablanca and Admiral Joseph J. Clark until their respective deaths.

== Biography ==
Olga Evgenyevna Choubaroff (or Chubarova) was born on September 23, 1898, in Tbilisi, the Caucasus region of Russian Empire. She was able to speak Russian, French and English fluently as an adult. She married four times during her life but never had any children. She has been described as a "hothead" who was outspoken about her political opinions.

=== Officer Chagodaev ===
Her first husband was a White Army officer with the surname Chagodaev. They escaped together from the Red Army in 1920. He was, according to Olga, a descendant of Genghis Khan, and prince, who left her his title. She called herself a princess after his death.

=== Jose Raul Capablanca ===
Her second husband was world chess champion Jose Raul Capablanca, whom she married on October 20, 1938, and stayed married until his death in 1942. Olga did not play chess. At their wedding her name was listed as "Princess Cagodalf" from the "Russian house of Chagodalf".

She was a muse to Capablanca during his later years. Before their marriage, he told her "I shall regain my crown for you." During their life together, she became his biographer, writing articles on him for "Chessworld", "Town and Country", "José Raoul Capablanca Ein Schachmythos", and the introduction to Capablanca's "Chess Lectures". After his death she donated his archives to the Manhattan Chess Club. In 1987, she sold for $10,000 her own unpublished manuscript of a game between Capablanca and Savielly Tartakower.

=== Olympic rower ===
Her third husband was a rowing champion who had won an Olympic gold medal and was much younger than her. When she was 85, she said that "Practically everything I have now came from him, but I'd rather not talk about that."

=== Admiral Joseph James Clark ===
Around 1963, she met her fourth husband, a retired Admiral named Joseph James Clark. They told friends and family that they got married in 1965. However, they didn't actually get married until 1967, around the same time that her sister Marie Blackton became the third wife of Hamilton Fish III. Their marriage eventually ran into troubles, and they contemplated divorce but stayed together until Clark's death on July 13, 1971. She later christened the guided-missile frigate USS Clark (FFG-11), named after her fourth husband, Admiral Joseph Clark.

Olga Clark did not marry again and died on April 24, 1994, in New York City at the age of 95.
