= ORP Gen. K. Pułaski =

1979 Oliver Hazard Perry-class frigate

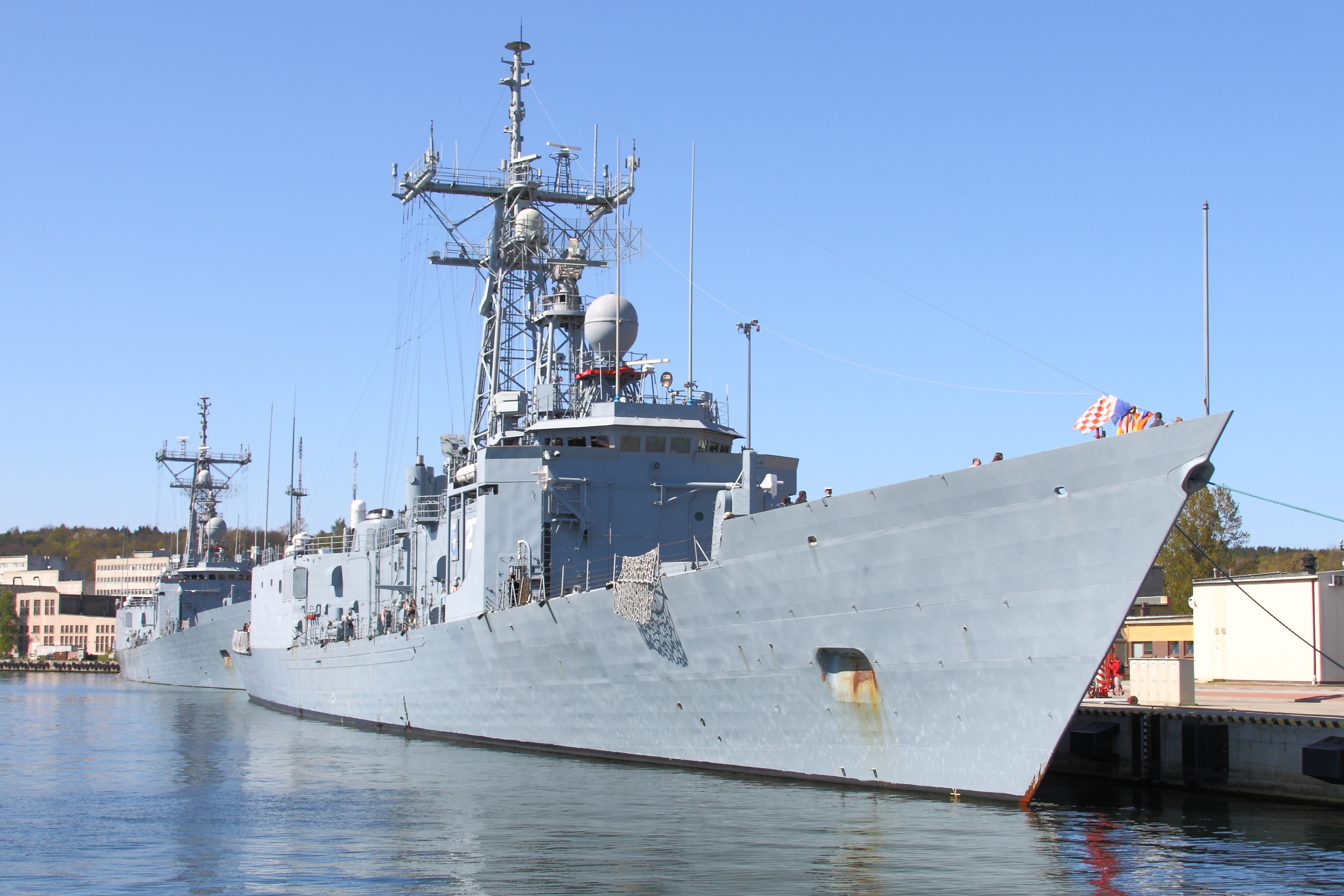
- ORP Generał Kazimierz Pułaski moored in Gdynia

History

United States
- Name: USS Clark
- Namesake: Admiral Joseph James "Jocko" Clark (1893–1971)
- Ordered: 27 February 1976
- Builder: Bath Iron Works, Bath, Maine
- Laid down: 17 July 1978
- Launched: 24 March 1979
- Sponsored by: Mrs. Olga Clark, widow of Admiral Clark
- Commissioned: 9 May 1980
- Decommissioned: 15 March 2000
- Stricken: 15 March 2000
- Home port: Norfolk, Virginia (former)
- Identification: Hull symbol:FFG-11; Code letters:NJJC
- Motto: "Determined Warrior"
- Fate: Disposed of through the Security Assistance Program (SAP) Sold to Polish Navy
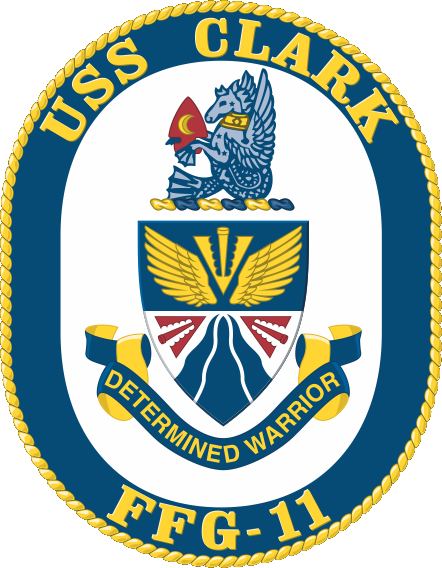
- Badge
- Complement: 15 officers and 190 enlisted, plus SH-60 LAMPS detachment of roughly six officer pilots and 15 enlisted maintainers
- Sensors & processing systems: AN/SPS-49 air-search radar; AN/SPS-55 surface-search radar; CAS and STIR fire-control radar; AN/SQS-56 sonar.
- Electronic warfare & decoys: AN/SLQ-32
- Armament: As built: 1 × OTO Melara Mk 75 76 mm/62 caliber naval gun; 2 × Mk 32 triple-tube (324 mm) launchers for Mark 46 torpedoes; 1 × Vulcan Phalanx CIWS; 4 × .50-cal (12.7 mm) machine guns.; 1 × Mk 13 Mod 4 single-arm launcher for Harpoon anti-ship missiles and SM-1MR Standard anti-ship/air missiles (40 round magazine); Note: As of 2004, Mk 13 systems removed from all active US vessels of this class.
- Aircraft carried: 1 × SH-60 LAMPS III helicopter

Poland
- Name: ORP Generał Kazimierz Pułaski
- Namesake: Casimir Pulaski
- Acquired: 15 March 2000
- Commissioned: 25 June 2000
- Identification: Pennant number: 272; MMSI number: 261268000; Callsign: SNWR
- Status: Active
- Complement: 17 officers and 198 enlisted
- Armament: 2 × double tube anti-submarine torpedo mounts; 1 × 76 mm (3.0 in) Rapid Fire Dual Purpose Gun; 1 × Vulcan Phalanx system; 1 × Guided missile launching system with Standard surface-to-air missiles; Boeing Harpoon surface-to-surface missiles
- Aircraft carried: ASW Kaman SH-2G Super Seasprite helicopter (removed 07.11.2025)

General characteristics
- Class & type: Oliver Hazard Perry-class frigate
- Displacement: 4,100 long tons (4,200 t), full load
- Length: 445 feet (136 m), overall
- Beam: 45 feet (14 m)
- Draft: 22 feet (6.7 m)
- Propulsion: 2 × General Electric LM2500-30 gas turbines generating 41,000 shp (31 MW) through a single shaft and variable pitch propeller; 2 × Auxiliary Propulsion Units, 350 hp (260 kW) retractable electric azimuth thrusters for maneuvering and docking.
- Speed: over 29 knots (54 km/h)
- Range: 5,000 nautical miles at 18 knots (9,300 km at 33 km/h)

ORP Generał Kazimierz Pułaski is one of two Oliver Hazard Perry-class guided-missile frigates of the Polish Navy. Formerly serving in the United States Navy as the USS Clark (FFG-11), after her transfer to Poland she was named for Kazimierz Pułaski, who fought in both the War of the Bar Confederation in Poland and later the American Revolutionary War. As the USS Clark, she was the US Navy's fifth ship of the Oliver Hazard Perry class, and was named for Admiral Joseph James "Jocko" Clark (1893–1971). The ship is propelled by two General Electric LM-2500 gas turbines and two 350 horsepower (261 kW) electric drive auxiliary propulsion units. The Gen K. Pułaski is currently homeported at Gdynia (Oksywie).

== History ==
=== US service ===
Ordered by the US Navy from Bath Iron Works on 27 February 1976 as part of the FY76 program, Clark was laid down on 17 July 1978 and launched on 24 March 1979. The frigate commissioned on 9 May 1980. She was the second US Navy ship commissioned with the name USS Clark. The ship sponsor was Mrs. Olga Clark, the widow of the ship's namesake.

In July 1982, Clark recovered three sailors that were washed overboard from the aircraft carrier John F. Kennedy in the Atlantic Ocean off the coast of Spain. A fourth sailor was not recovered and was lost at sea.

In December 1992, Clark was nearby when the crew of an F-14 was forced to eject during training operations off the coast of Virginia. Clark's helicopter rescued the radar intercept officer and a United States Coast Guard helicopter rescued the pilot.

In April 1994, Clark changed homeports from Newport, Rhode Island, to Norfolk, Virginia. The ship had previously been homeported in Philadelphia, Pennsylvania from the mid-1980s to 1992 and Mayport, Florida before that. Decommissioned and stricken from the US Navy list on 15 March 2000, she was transferred to the Polish Navy that same day.

=== Polish service ===
The ship was commissioned as ORP Generał Kazimierz Pułaski (after Kazimierz Pułaski) on 25 June 2000, at a ceremony attended by US Secretary of State Madeleine Albright. Commander Marian Ambroziak was the first Polish commanding officer. Since her transfer to Poland, Generał Kazimierz Pułaski has participated in numerous NATO exercises in the Baltic Sea.

== Awards as USS Clark ==
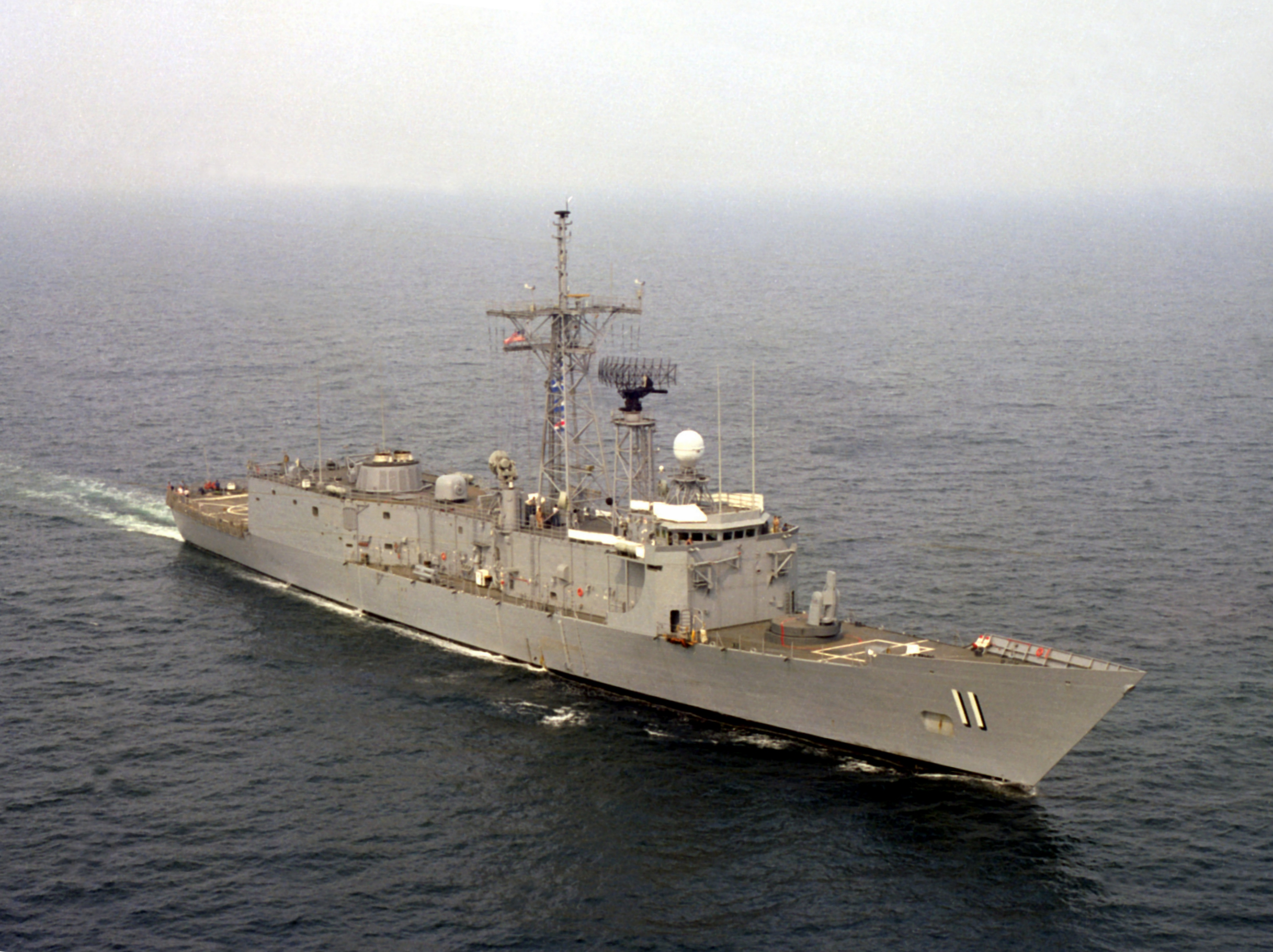
A starboard bow view of the guided missile frigate USS Clark underway.

USS Clark and her crew received the following unit awards, according to the US Navy unit awards website:

- Humanitarian Service Medal for the evacuation of Lebanon, 23 to 25 June 1982
- Armed Forces Expeditionary Medal for Lebanon from 11 December 1983 to 21 January 1984
- US Coast Guard Unit Commendation, 31 October 1984 to 31 December 1984
- Meritorious Unit Commendation, 1 February 1984 to 21 April 1984
- US Coast Guard Special Operations Service Ribbon, three awards, for April to June 1989, July to September 1989 and 19 January 1990 to 24 February 1990.
- Navy E Ribbon, two awards, for the years of 1992 and 1995
- Joint Meritorious Unit Award for the year of 1997.

USS Clark was also nominated for the United States Public Health Service Outstanding Unit Citation for operations from 24 June 1994 to 12 July 1994, but did not receive the award. The ship was reported near Haiti in mid-July 1994 around the time many refugees were fleeing Haiti in small boats.

== See also ==
- USS Pulaski for US Navy ships of a similar name.
