= ORP Ślązak (2015) =

Polish Navy offshore patrol vessel

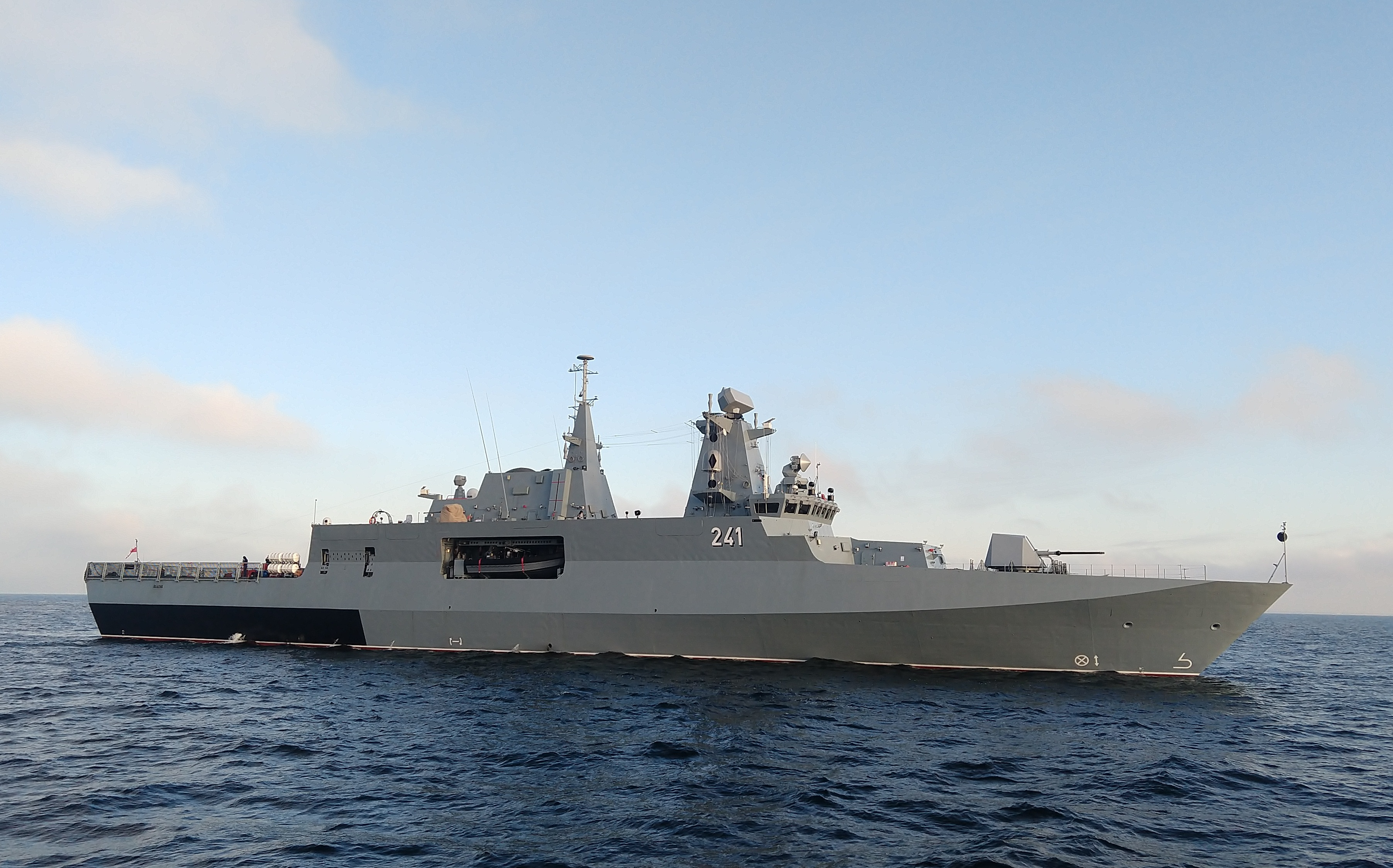
- ORP Ślązak

History

Poland
- Name: ORP Ślązak
- Builder: Stocznia Marynarki Wojennej
- Laid down: 28 November 2001
- Launched: 2 June 2015
- Commissioned: 28 November 2019
- Out of service: 2023
- Status: under repair from 2023

General characteristics
- Displacement: 1,800 tonnes (standard); 2,150 tonnes (full load)
- Length: 95.2 m (312 ft)
- Beam: 13.5 m (44 ft)
- Draught: 3.60 m (11.8 ft)
- Propulsion: 1 × GE LM2500+ gas turbine; 2 × MTU 12V595TE90 diesel engines
- Speed: 30 kn (56 km/h)
- Range: 4500 NM
- Complement: up to 97
- Sensors & processing systems: Thales SMART-S Mk 2 search radar; Thales STING-EO Mk 2 fire control radar; Thales MIRADOR Electro-Optics; TACTICOS combat management system; L3 ELAC Nautik Vanguard navigation and warning sonar; TACAN tactical air navigation system; IFF system
- Armament: Guns: 1 × 76mm Oto Melara gun; 2 × 30mm Oto Melara Marlin-WS; 4 × 12.7mm WKM-B machine guns; 4 × Grom surface-to-air missile
- Aircraft carried: flight deck

ORP Ślązak (241) is an offshore patrol vessel of the Polish Navy, formerly known as Gawron-class corvette. The ship is named Ślązak (Polish: Silesian). It is a licence variant of the MEKO A-100 project developed by Blohm + Voss.

== Construction ==
In 1997 Poland was invited to join NATO and became a member state on 12 March 1999. In December 1997 representatives of the Ministry of National Defence and the Polish Navy selected a conceptual design for future multipurpose corvettes. Inquiries were sent to four foreign shipyards from the UK, the US, Germany and Sweden. The commission decided to go with the German MEKO A-100 corvette design by Blohm + Voss. The technical project was approved in 2001. A final agreement with Stocznia Marynarki Wojennej (Naval Shipyard in Gdynia) was signed on 27 November 2001 for construction of one Projekt 621 (shipyard designation Gawron) corvette, a second (optional) and five consecutive (optional). At the same time the shipyard signed a licensing agreement worth PLN 60 million for the use of the MEKO A-100 concept. The keel of the first ship was laid on 28 November 2001 in the presence of Poland's Prime Minister Leszek Miller.

In 2000 and 2002 Polish Navy commissioned two ex-US Navy Oliver Hazard Perry-class frigates and on 23 December 2002 financing was cut to a single corvette. Unlike multirole combat aircraft acquisition financed separate of National Defence budget, the program wasn't a priority for the Armed Forces and suffered from insufficient funding. The cost was initially set at PLN 250 million per ship. In 2003 estimated total cost of a single Gawron-class corvette was estimated at PLN 850 million, in 2005 at around PLN 1.1 billion. Finally in 2012 the figures have grown to PLN 1.5 billion (EUR 360 mln).

In 2007 a shipyard awarded Italian Avio a USD 10 million deal to provide CODAG propulsion system. In 2008 the hull was at 80% completion when financial crisis broke up. In 2009 the defence budget was cut by 5 billion PLN. This led to postpone the decision to order the combat systems worth PLN 824 million that was negotiated with Thales in 2008. The ships planned armament included RIM-162 ESSM and RIM-116 RAM surface-to-air missiles, RBS-15 Mk 3 anti-ship missiles and MU90 Impact torpedoes. On 16 September 2009 the hull already with engines, turbines, generators, line shafts and air-conditioners completed technical launching for the first time. At the same time the Ministry of Defence decided to suspend corvette financing. In April 2011 the court declared Naval Shipyard's bankruptcy. On 24 February 2012 Gawron program was cancelled. At that time the hull was largely completed at the cost of 402 million PLN (~US$130m), but equipping it with combat systems would have cost an additional 1 billion PLN (~US$320m). On 23 September 2013 an annex to 2001 construction contract was signed to complete the sole unit as patrol vessel. Due to design changes the program code name was changed to Projekt 621M. ORP Ślązak modular design and systems allows to upgrade it to the corvette configuration in the future.

In December 2013 Thales Group was selected as mission suite supplier for 100 million euro worth contract. A contract with Thales for delivery of the integrated combat system for the Ślązak was signed in March 2014. The deal include TACTICOS Combat Management System, SMART-S Mk2 surveillance radar, STING-EO Mk2 fire control radar, MIRADOR electro-optical observation and fire control system and LINK 11/16 tactical data link system.

On 2 July 2015 ORP Ślązak was christened during official launching ceremony, becoming the first new Polish-built Navy ship in 21 years, since the minesweeper ORP Wdzydze (TRB 646) was launched in 1994. It was expected to be commissioned in November 2016, however in 2016 the commissioning was delayed until 2018 and in 2018, until 2019.

In 2016 the ship underwent systems trials, including engine room, power generators, fire control consoles and boats lifting and lowering hydraulic system. It will be equipped with six-seat Markos MK-500 and fifteen-seat MK-790 rigid-hulled inflatable boats. The units OTO Melara Super Rapid MF L/62 main gun was mounted on June 15, 2016.

The ship has been under repair since 2023.
