= Andrzej Karweta =

Polish Admiral (1958-2010)

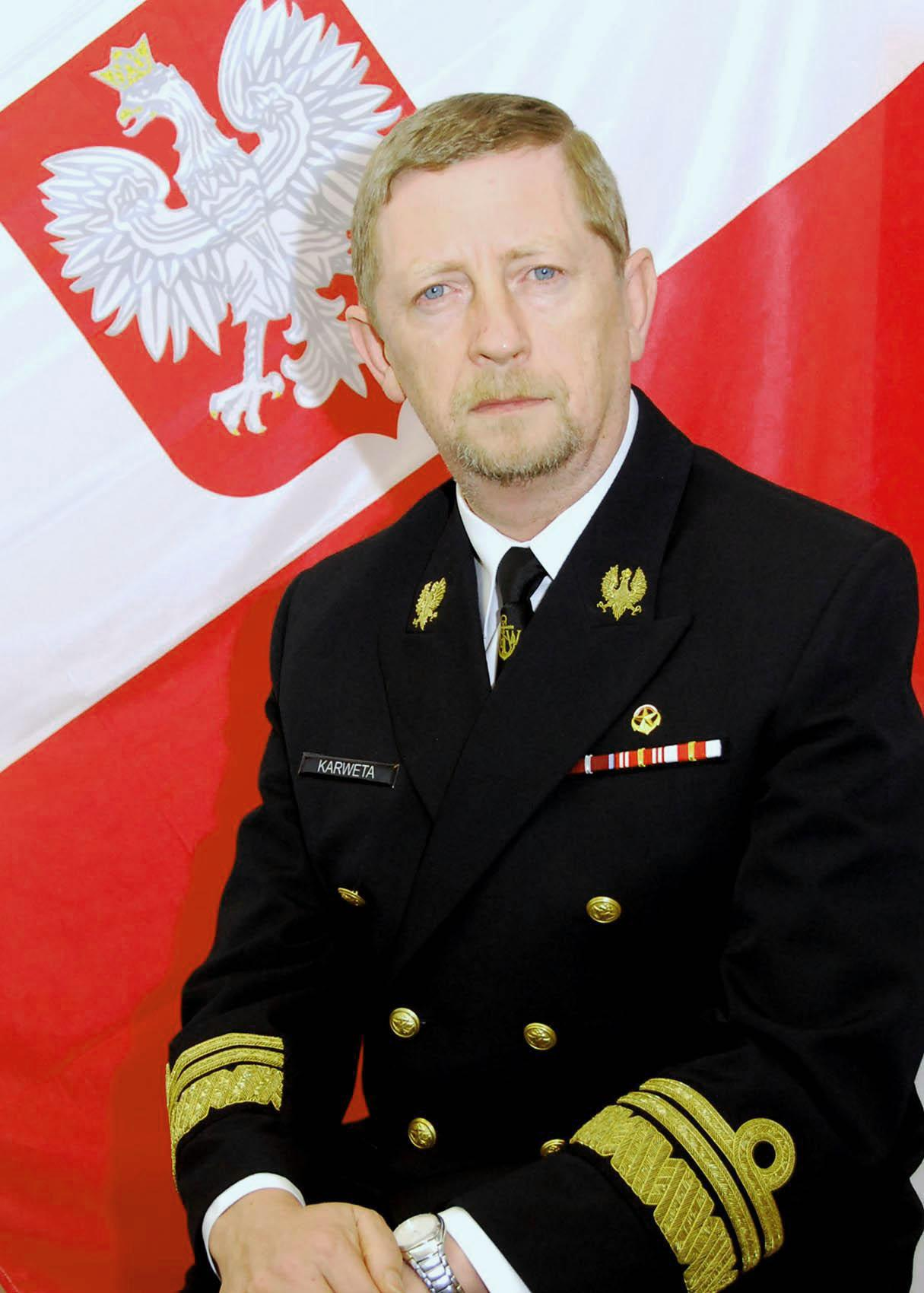
- Born: 11 June 1958; Jaworzno, Poland
- Died: 10 April 2010 (aged 51); Smolensk, Russia
- Military career
- Allegiance: Poland
- Branch: Polish Navy
- Rank: Admiral (NATO code OF-9)
- Awards: Silver Cross of Merit

Andrzej Karweta (11 June 1958 – 10 April 2010) was rear admiral (NATO code OF-7) of the Polish Navy and its commander-in-chief from November 2007 until his death in April 2010 in the Smolensk air disaster. He was posthumously promoted to the rank of admiral (NATO code OF-9).

== Biography ==
Andrzej Karweta was born in Jeleń village (part of Jaworzno since 1977). In 1977 he started studies at the Polish Naval Academy in Gdynia and graduated in 1982, with the rank of Lieutenant Junior Grade (podporucznik marynarki). In following years he attended further studies, including Defence Politics at the Polish National Defence University in Warsaw (2006) and studies at Royal College of Defence Studies in London.

He started service in the 13th Minesweeper Division in Hel in 1982. In 1986 he took his first command, of ORP Czapla (Projekt 206F class minesweeper), in 1989 of another minesweeper ORP Mewa and a group of minesweepers. In 1992-1996 he was chief of staff and second in command of the 13th Minesweeper Division, later he became its commander. During BALTOPS 2000 maneuvers he commanded an international anti-mine warfare group.

In 2002 he became deputy commander of the Underwater Warfare Division in Supreme Allied Commander Atlantic (SACLANT), and was a Polish representative in SACLANT headquarters. In 2005 he returned to Poland and served as the second in command of the 8th Coast Defence Flotilla in Świnoujście. On 3 May 2007 he was promoted to rear admiral and became a deputy chief of Polish Navy Staff in Gdynia. On 11 November 2007 he was promoted to commodore (NATO code OF-6) and became a deputy chief of Polish Navy Staff in Gdynia. On 11 November 2007 he was promoted to rear admiral (NATO code OF-7) and appointed the Polish Navy's commander-in-chief.

He was listed on the flight manifest of the Tupolev Tu-154 of the 36th Special Aviation Regiment carrying the President of Poland Lech Kaczyński which crashed near Smolensk-North airport near Smolensk, Russia, on 10 April 2010, killing all aboard.

== Honours and awards ==
Commander's Cross of the Order of Polonia Restituta (2010, posthumously)
Silver Cross of Merit (2005; Bronze Cross, 2001)
Gold Medal of the Armed Forces in the Service of the Fatherland
Gold Medal for his contribution to national defence
Medal Pro Memoria
Haller Ring - the highest award of the Maritime and River League
Grand Officer of the Order of Merit (2008, Portugal)

== See also ==
- 2010 Polish Air Force Tu-154 crash
