= Marian Jeliński =

Kashubian activist

Dr. Marian Jeliński
- Marión Jelińsczi
- Born: 1949 (age 76–77); Siemirowice, Poland
- Education: Wydział Medycyny Weterynaryjnej, University of Warmia and Mazury; University of Veterinary Medicine Hannover; Free University of Berlin; Państwowy Instytut Weterynaryjny
- Occupations: Apiologist; Novelist
- Employer: National Veterinary Research Institute at the Department of Diseases of Useful Insects
- Organizations: Gdańsk Scientific Society; New York Academy of Sciences
- Known for: Kashubian activism
- Spouse: Alicja
- Children: 2

Marian Jeliński (Kashubian: Marión Jelińsczi) was born in Siemirowice (Kashubian: Szëmrejce), in 1949. Jeliński is a recognized authority in bee diseases and an active member of the Kashubian community. He is involved in a range of activities focusing on the preservation of the Kashubian language and culture. Jeliński is also known for his support of Kashubian embroidery and building bridges between Kashubian communities in Poland and Canada. He and his wife, Alicja, have two sons and currently live in Żukowo, near Gdańsk, Poland.

Jeliński studied veterinary medicine in Hannover, earning his graduate and eventually taking a job at the National Veterinary Research Institute. He earned his Ph.D. in veterinary sciences in 1980.

After a trip to Bulgaria in 1976, Jeliński began to focus his research on finding ways to protect bees from deadly parasites. He helped develop a treatment for Varroa destructor, and his findings in bee diseases were highly regarded for decades afterward.

== Education ==
In 1968, Jeliński enrolled at the Agricultural and Technical University of Olsztyn, to study veterinary medicine, broadening his prospective at the Tierärztliche Hochschule in Hannover, Germany. In 1974, he completed his graduate studies and became a veterinarian, accepting employment from the National Veterinary Research Institute at the Department of Diseases of Useful Insects in Swarzędz, near Poznań.

In 1978, Jeliński received a scholarship to study at the Free University of (West) Berlin. During the three months he spent there, he demonstrated how a strain of Bacillus possesses mycolytic properties against Ascosphaera mycelia.

In 1980, Jeliński submitted his Ph.D. in veterinary sciences at the National Veterinary Research Institute of Puławy, Poland. His dissertation contributed to a greater understanding of the biochemical activities of Paenibacillus larvae subsp. larvae (formerly classified as Bacillus larvae) – i.e., American foulbrood is caused by this bacterium.

== Professional life ==
A 1976 visit to Bulgaria had a profound impact on his career. Here, for the first time Jeliński witnessed the deadly parasitic mite, Varroa destructor. While at the Bulgarian Department of Microbiology, Jeliński (along with Dr. M. Shabanov) published an article in the Polish magazine Pszczelarstwo (The Beekeeping) about this deadly parasite that affects honey bees. Later, he published the V. destructor (formerly classified as Varroa jacobsoni) article in Austria and France.

When, in 1980, the mite Varroa destructor was detected in Poland, and later causing death of many bee colonies and no satisfactory treatment had yet been found, Jeliński vastly contributed to the testing of Apiwarol AS – amitraz and Warrosekt – malation as an effective alternative treatment. Applied as smoke, these agents helped to control Varroa infestation. As a subject matter expert, Jeliński’s research on bee diseases results were in broad use in Poland for the next couple of decades.

In 1988, Jeliński found for the first time Varroa destructor on Vespula vulgaris. Jeliński was actively involved in providing training to Ghanaian and Iraqi beekeepers.

Jeliński is a member of the New York Academy of Sciences, the Scientific Association of Gdańsk (Poland) and the Foundation of Beekeeping Open-Air Museum in Żukowo (Poland).

Jeliński has written or co-written more than 200 articles, published in Polish, English, German and Bulgarian. He is a recognized name in the beekeeping community, thanks to his publications in such professional journals as Pszczelarstwo (Beekeeping), Pszczelarz Polski (The Polish Beekeeper), Medycyna Weterynaryjna (Veterinary Medicine) and Apidologie (Apidology).

=== Conferences ===
Jeliński regularly participates in professional workshops and conferences.

- 1987 – Warsaw, Poland. International Beekeeping Congress – Apimondia.
- 1993 – Rez, Czech Republic. A workshop with participants from 18 European countries (European Union as well as Eastern and Central Europe) Jeliński presented the results of the study on the usefulness of different Varroa control substances, incorporated in plastic carriers.
- 1995 – Nitra, Slovak Republic. The International Expert Conference: "On the issue of infections of bee and brood."
- 1998 – Storkow, Germany. The 4th Polish – German Symposium: "New demands for honeybee breeding in the 21st century."

=== Awards and recognitions ===
- 1989 – recognized by the Polish Federation of Engineering Associations FSNT–NOT (Polish: Naczelna Organizacja Techniczna NOT) for his contributions to the development of the "Apiwarol AS" and "Warrosekt" medication to fight Varroa destructor.
- 2000 – Gold Cross of Merit.

== Kashubian activist ==
An outspoken supporter of Kashubian language preservation, Jeliński uses it daily, and is actively involved in many undertakings. Foundation of Beekeeping Open-Air Museum (M. Jeliński) and David Shulist (for a long time head of the Wilno Heritage Society - Canada) were instrumental in several displays in Żukowo of Kashubian embroidery works, done by the students of Madawaska Valley schools.

== Works ==
Jeliński is an author of many novels and short stories, including:

- Goscëna (English: Visit) novel
- Doktor Alosz z Grifa Kaszëbsczégò (English: Doctor Alosz of the Kashubian Griffin)
- Moje Kaszëbë (English: My Kashubia)
- Rozdrapią nasze gniôzdo (English: They’ll Demolish Our Nest)
- Dwòrsczi lesny (English: The Manor Beekeeper)
- Mieszkańcë (English: Residents)
- Kaszëbi we Gduńsku (English: Kashubs in Gdańsk)
- Przeszczépienié (English: Transplantation)
- Pańdôrz (English: Sequestrator)
- Stądka do wiecznoscë (English: From Here to Infinity)
- Gaszenié dëcha rëbôków (English: Quenching Fishermen’s Spirit)

Jeliński developed Kashubian dictionaries. Along with David Shulist of Wilno, Ontario, Jeliński published two multi-language dictionaries:

- Polish-English-Kashubian Dictionary (Pòlskò-anielskò-kaszëbsczi słowôrz) (2010, ISBN 9788392856900)
- Kashubian-English-Polish Dictionary (Kaszëbskò-anielskò-pòlsczi słowôrz) (2011, ISBN 9788392856917)

=== Translations ===
Jeliński translated Bolesław Jażdżewski’s Wspòmnienia kaszëbsczégò gbùra (Kashubian Farmer’s Recollections) and helped to translate Geògrafiô Kaszëbia (Geography of Kashubia) by Jan Mordawski
