= Gawron-class corvette =

Polish Navy corvette

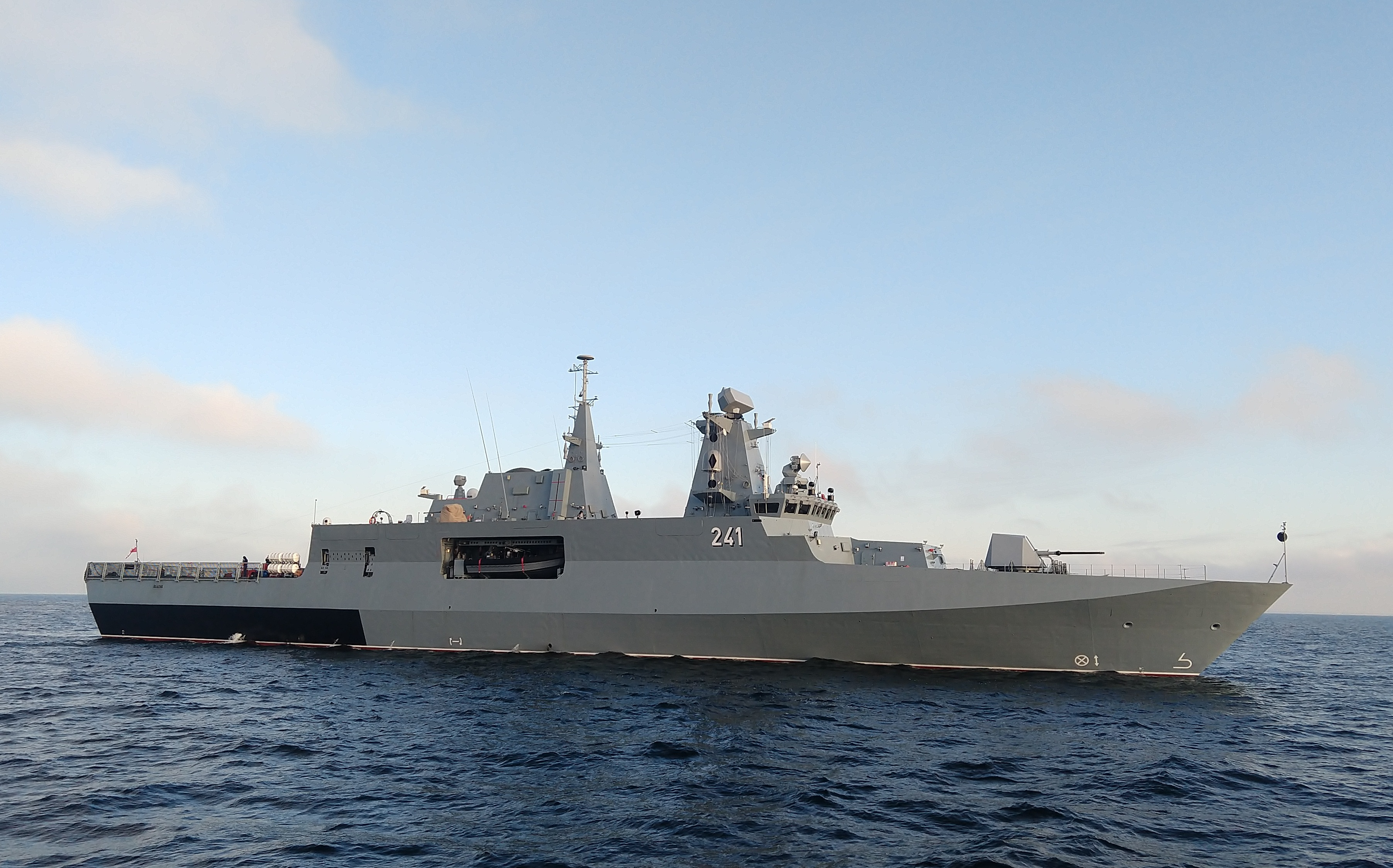
- ORP Ślązak

Class overview
- Name: Projekt 621 (Gawron class)
- Builders: Stocznia Marynarki Wojennej
- Operators: Polish Navy
- Built: 2001 – 2012
- In commission: 2019 – present
- Planned: 7
- Completed: 1
- Canceled: 6
- Active: 1

General characteristics
- Type: Corvette
- Displacement: 1,650–2,050 tonnes
- Length: 90.10–95.20 m (295.6–312.3 ft)
- Beam: 12.80–13.30 m (42.0–43.6 ft)
- Draught: 3.35–3.60 m (11.0–11.8 ft)
- Propulsion: 1 × General Electric LM2500 gas turbine; 2 × MTU diesel engines
- Speed: 29.5 knots (55 km/h; 34 mph) (planned)
- Armament: Planned: 1 × OTO Melara 76 mm gun; RBS-15 Mk.3; RIM-162 ESSM; RAM Mk 31; MU90 Impact; Built: 1 × OTO Melara 76 mm gun; 2 × Marlin-WS 30 mm gun; 4 × 12.7 mm machine gun

The Gawron class (Polish: rook) or Projekt 621 was a planned class of multipurpose corvettes ordered by Polish Navy. The Gawron class was a variant of the MEKO A-100 project developed by the Blohm + Voss shipyard in Germany. Construction of the first ship of the class started in 2001. The project was terminated in February 2012 but in October 2013 a contract was signed to complete the existing hull as a patrol ship by 2016. On 2 July 2015, ORP Ślązak was christened and launched, and on 28 November 2019, ORP Ślązak was officially commissioned into the Polish Navy.

== Construction of Projekt 621 class corvettes ==
The contract for the construction of seven multi-purpose corvettes of project 621 was signed on November 27, 2001. It was decided to use the ready-made design of the German Meko A-100 ships, and therefore a license was purchased for them. The keel was laid the next day, November 28, 2001. However, due to the limitation of the Gawron series program by the Ministry of National Defense to only one unit in December 2002, and a significant reduction in financing the construction of the prototype ship, the construction of the first ship in the series encountered financial difficulties. Therefore, the construction of the ship could not proceed in a timely manner. On June 26, 2003, an annex to the original 2001 contract was signed, which abandoned the option for another six ships, which meant that the order was limited to only one vessel. Lack of progress in construction due to insufficient financing resulted in the fact that in February 2012 the Prime Minister decided to close the Gawron corvette program in its entirety and sell the unfinished prototype. In the same year, however, decisions were made to build a patrol unit with limited combat capabilities based on the ship's hull. The prototype unit was launched as a patrol ship in 2015, designated the project 621M. The name of the vessel was changed from "Gawron" to "Ślązak" (Polish: Silesian).

At the time of the cancellation, the hull of the first ship was largely completed at the cost of 402 million PLN (~US$130m), but equipping it would have cost an additional 1 billion PLN (~US$320m). A single existing Gawron hull will be completed without main armament as heavy patrol vessel at the cost of 100 million PLN.

== Ships ==
Ship name	Status	Notes
Ślązak	Commissioned 28 November 2019	Active
Kujawiak	Cancelled	
Krakowiak	Cancelled	
Mazur	Cancelled	
Kurp	Cancelled	
Góral	Cancelled	
Mazowieckie	Cancelled	

== Projekt 621M class patrol corvette ==
Due to the fact that in 2012 it was decided to convert the unfinished project 621 corvette into a patrol unit, a number of changes were introduced to the project. The ship's design was designated 621M. The changes included, among others, space on the side for two boats: one boarding and one working. The ceremonial launching and baptism of the ship took place on July 2, 2015 at the Naval Shipyard in Gdynia . It was planned that the Silesian would be handed over to the recipient by November 2016, but in 2016 a delay of several months in its construction was announced. In the same year, the main armament was installed in "Ślązak", and in 2017, radars and two Marlin-WS guns. In January 2018, work on the construction of the vessel was suspended, and in March 2018, the ship was taken over by the trustee of the already bankrupt MW shipyard by the Armament Inspectorate in order to complete the construction in the newly created Shipyard belonging to Polska Grupa Zbrojeniowa. In June 2018, an agreement was signed between the Armament Inspectorate and a consortium of Polska Grupa Zbrojeniowa and PGZ Stocznia Wojenna for the completion of the construction of Ślązak, conducting tests of the ship and delivery and acceptance tests . On November 8, 2019, PGZ SA and PGZ Stocznia Wojenna, after successfully completing all tests and shipbuilding and sea trials, handed over Ślązak to the Polish Navy, and on November 28, 2019, the flag of the war was raised on it as an ORP Ślązak patrol corvette.

=== Final armament ===
- Guns: 1 × OTO Melara 76 mm gun, 2 × Marlin-WS, 4 × WKM-B 12,7 mm guns
- Anti air: 4 × PPZR Grom

== See also ==
- Volodymyr Velykyi-class corvette
- Meteoro-class offshore patrol vessel – ships of a similar configuration
