= Joseph J. Clark =

United States Navy admiral (1893–1971)

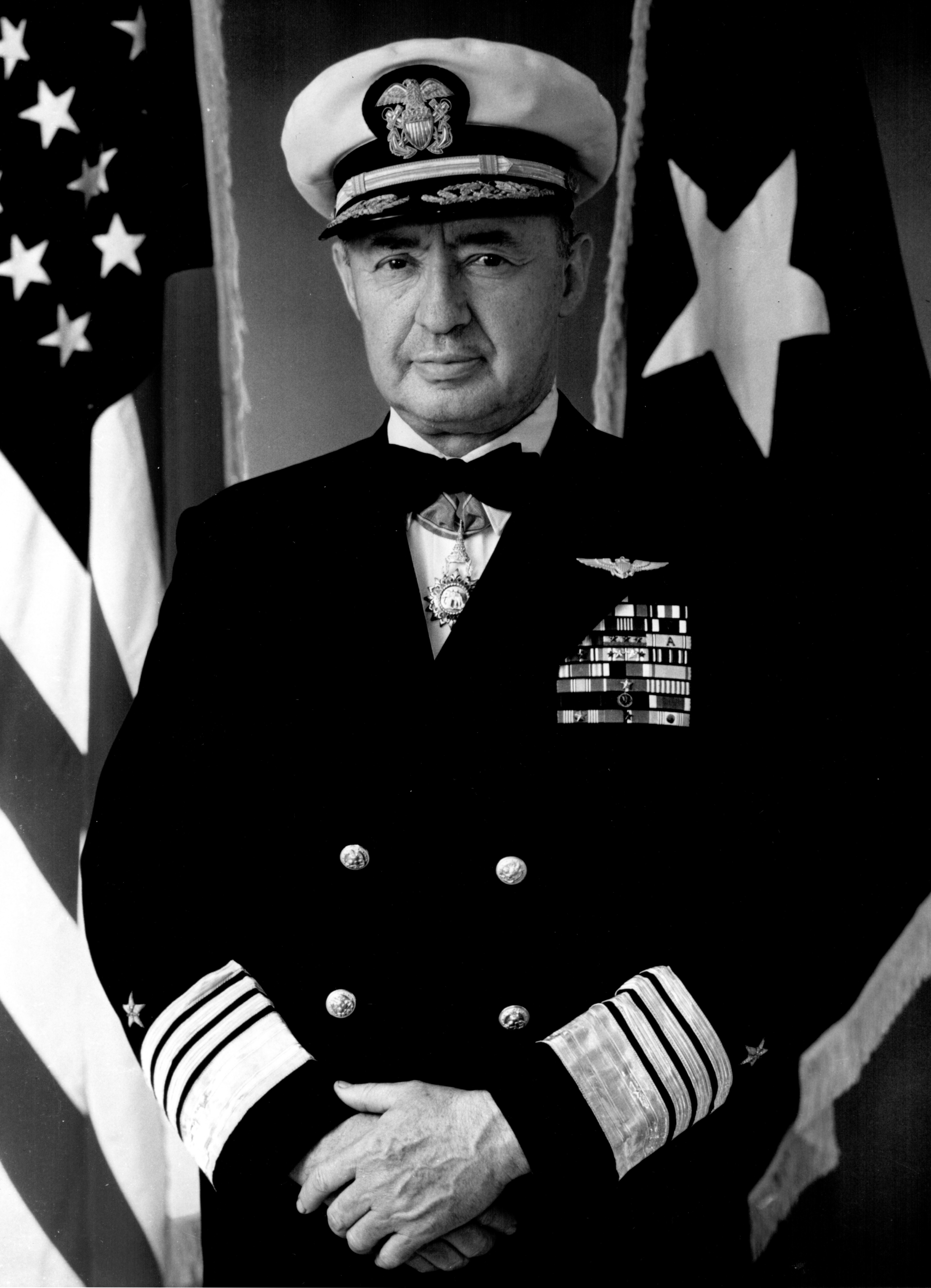
- Born: 12 November 1893; Pryor, Cherokee Nation, Indian Territory (now Pryor Creek, Oklahoma), U.S.
- Died: 13 July 1971 (aged 77); St. Albans, New York, U.S.
- Burial place: Arlington National Cemetery
- Military career
- Allegiance: United States of America
- Branch: United States Navy
- Service years: 1917–1953
- Rank: Admiral
- Nickname: "Jocko"
- Commands: Suwannee (ACV-27); Yorktown (CV-10); Task Group 58.1/38.1; Fast Carrier Task Force (TF 77); 7th Fleet
- Conflicts: World War I; World War II; Operation Torch; Mariana and Palau Islands campaign; Battle of the Philippine Sea; Korean War
- Awards: Navy Cross; Navy Distinguished Service Medal; Silver Star; Legion of Merit

Joseph James Clark (12 November 1893 – 13 July 1971) was an admiral in the United States Navy who commanded aircraft carriers during World War II. During the Korean War, he led again a carrier Task Force and subsequently commanded the 7th Fleet. Born and raised in Indian Territory (which later became part of Oklahoma) and a member of the Cherokee Nation, in 1917 he became the first Native American to be graduated from the United States Naval Academy. Clark preferred to be called "J. J." or by the nickname "Jocko" instead of his full name.

== Early years ==
Joseph J. Clark was born to William A. and Lillie Berry Clark in Pryor in the Cherokee Nation, Indian Territory before it became part of the state of Oklahoma. (Note: Oklahoma became a state on November 16, 1907.) His father was a member of the Cherokee Nation. Joseph attended Willie Halsell College in Vinita, Oklahoma, and the Oklahoma Agricultural and Mechanical College (now named Oklahoma State University) in Stillwater, Oklahoma, prior to being appointed to the U.S. Naval Academy, where he played on the lacrosse and soccer teams. He was commissioned as Ensign upon graduating in 1917. Clark's nickname, "Jocko", originated at the Naval Academy: on one of his first days there, he was standing in ranks when a classmate called out "The Right Reverend J. Jonathan Jockey Clark!" His wife, Olga Clark, néé Chubarova, was the widow of chess world champion José Raúl Capablanca.

== Naval career ==
=== World War I and inter-war service ===
Although Clark was officially a member of the Class of 1918 at the U.S. Naval Academy, he actually was graduated with the class of 1917. He was first posted to the cruiser USS North Carolina, which was convoying troops across the Atlantic Ocean. After World War I ended, he remained in the permanent navy, serving at sea aboard the destroyers USS Aaron Ward, USS Aulick, and USS Brooks in the Middle East. He was commanding Brooks on his return to the U.S., then was put in command of the USS Bulmer. Bulmer was assigned to American Relief Administration and Near East Relief. Clark returned to the U.S. in 1923 and was posted as an instructor at the Naval Academy during 1923–1924. He then went to NAS Pensacola in Florida for flight training and graduated as a naval aviator on 16 March 1925.

Clark served a wide variety of posts throughout the rest of the 1920s and the 1930s. In 1925, he helped Commander John Rodgers prepare for the first West Coast–Hawaii flight in 1925, receiving a letter of commendation for this service. In 1926, he served as senior aviation officer aboard the USS Mississippi. The next year, he was an aide to the Commander, Battleship Division Three, and served as division aviation officer. From 1928 to 1931, Clark was executive officer, NAS Anacostia, in Washington, D.C., and during the next two years was commanding officer of Fighting Squadron Two, attached to the aircraft carrier USS Lexington.

He was the aeronautical member of the Board of Inspection and Survey, Navy Department, from 1933 to July 1936, and during his next tour of sea duty July 1936 to June 1937, served as the Lexington's assistant air officer and carrier representative at Fleet Air Detachment, NAS San Diego, California. From July 1937, to May 1939, he was executive officer of the Fleet Air Base, Pearl Harbor. He then served as inspector of naval aircraft at the Curtiss Aircraft Corporation, Buffalo, New York.

Clark was then sent to NAS Jacksonville, Florida, as executive officer from December 1940 until May 1941. He was then posted to the USS Yorktown as Executive Officer. He was in that position when the Japanese attacked Pearl Harbor and returned to his former post with Yorktown in time to participate in raids on the Gilbert and Marshall Islands.

=== World War II ===
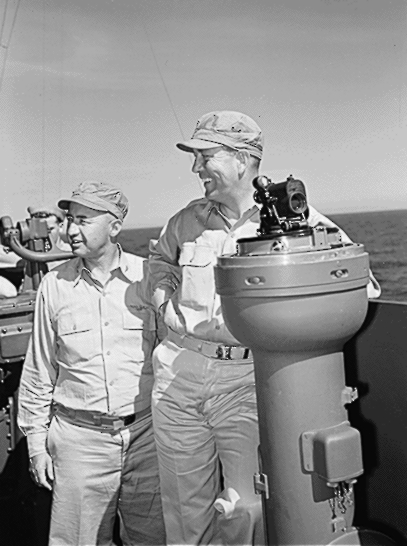
U.S. Navy Rear Admiral Arthur W. Radford and Captain Joseph J. "Jocko" Clark are shown on the open bridge of the aircraft carrier USS Yorktown (CV-10), in October 1943

At the start of U.S. involvement in World War II, Clark was known as an aggressive commander, ready to take his group into battle. He commanded the escort carrier USS Suwannee in the Atlantic Ocean and off the coast of North Africa during the allied landings of November 1942 (Operation Torch). He then assumed command of the newly commissioned USS Yorktown (CV-10). (Note: This ship was named after the aircraft carrier Yorktown, which was sunk at the Battle of Midway in June 1942.) During Clark's command, Yorktown became the setting for the documentary The Fighting Lady, which detailed World War II aircraft carrier operations. In the documentary, Clark is identified only by his nickname of "Jocko" and is voiced by Harry Morgan.

In January 1944, Vice Admiral Marc Mitscher made the Yorktown his flagship. Mitscher was impressed with Clark's seamanship and fighting spirit. In February 1944, Clark was promoted to rear admiral and was transferred temporarily to Task Force 58 while still reporting to Mitscher, who was then commanding the Fast Carrier Task Force in the Fifth Fleet. Since all of the task group command slots were occupied, Clark hoisted his flag aboard the new aircraft carrier USS Hornet (CV-12). (Note: named for a sunken carrier USS Hornet (CV-8).) (Note: Junior admirals were initially assigned in a "makee-learn" status onboard a carrier before a task group commander position became open.) But Mitscher soon became disappointed with the performance of Rear Admiral Charles Alan Pownall commanding Task Group 3 and replaced him with Clark. Clark commanded this group in the Marianas campaign, and on multiple occasions his task group was sent north to interdict Japanese aircraft shuttling down from Japan via intermediate islands. His air groups executed air attacks on the shuttle islands of Chichi Jima and Iwo Jima so often that the sailors of the Fast Carrier Task Force nicknamed them the "Jocko Jimas". (Note: Pownall, whom Clark replaced, was later diagnosed as having experienced a "nervous breakdown", triggered by stress and his chief of staff's death in battle; this explained his slack off in behavior. He was allowed to keep his rank, but was reassigned to noncombat duty in a training command in the U.S. and was never again considered for combat command.)

Clark commanded his task group in conjunction with the rest of Task Force 58 in the Battle of the Philippine Sea. His flagship was the carrier Hornet. On the second day of the battle, with his planes returning after sundown, Clark ordered his ships to light up, allowing most planes to land safely.

=== Korean War ===
Clark commanded the Fast Carrier Task Force (TF 77) during the Korean War. He was later promoted to vice admiral and rose to command the 7th Fleet. While in Command of the 7th Fleet, he took the USS New Jersey as his flagship. Before retiring from the Navy on December 1, 1953, he was promoted to the rank of admiral.

== Final years ==
After retiring from the navy, he lived in New York City, where he was chairman of Hegeman - Harris, Inc., an investment company.

He was made an honorary chief by both the Sioux and Cherokee Nations.

Clark died on 13 July 1971, at the naval hospital in St. Albans, New York. He is buried in Arlington National Cemetery, Section 3, Site 2525-B.

== Honors and awards ==
His many awards and medals include the Navy Cross, Navy Distinguished Service Medal, Silver Star, Legion of Merit with Combat "V", Navy Commendation Medal and the Korean Order of Military Merit. In addition to these most commonly mentioned, he also received the following: Army Distinguished Service Medal for service in Korea, Silver Star Medal, Commendation Ribbon with Combat "V", Army Commendation Ribbon, Ribbon with stars for the Presidential Unit Citation to the USS Suwanee, USS Yorktown, and USS Hornet; Victory Medals for World War I and for World War II; American Defense Service Medal; European–African–Middle Eastern Campaign Medal (with one star), Asiatic–Pacific Campaign Medal (with twelve service stars) Campaign Medal, the Philippine Liberation Ribbon (one star), Korean Service Medal (one star), United Nations Service Medal, and the National Defense Service Medal.

Clark's flag lieutenant was historian Clark G. Reynolds's uncle. Reynolds was chosen to co-author Clark's autobiography, and later wrote his own biography of Clark.

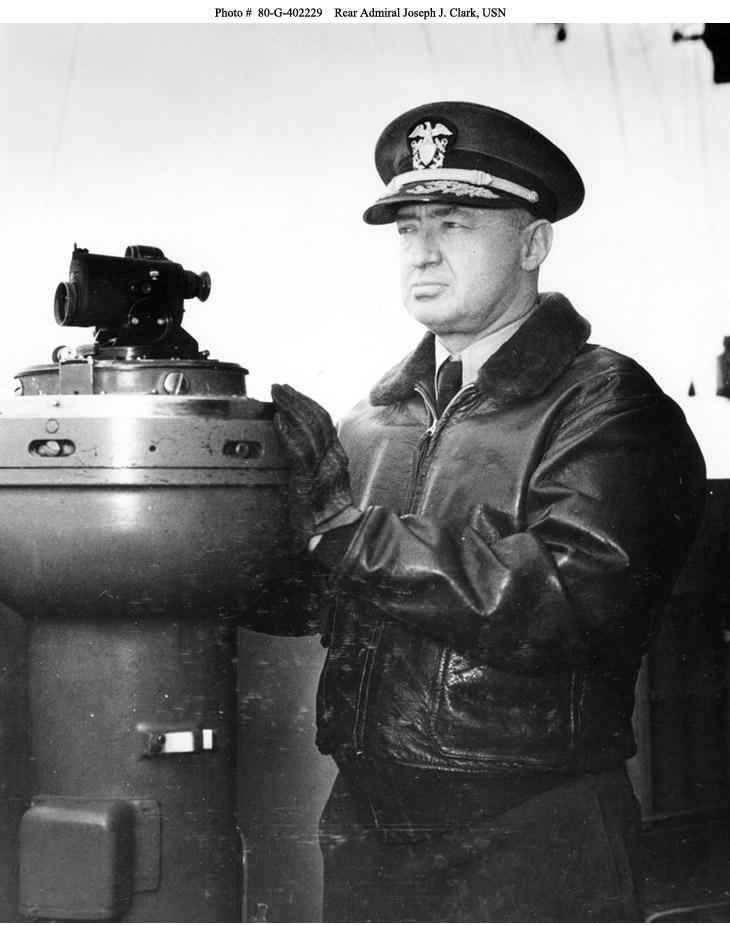
Admiral Joseph Clark

Clark was inducted into the Oklahoma Hall of Fame in 1952.

The National Aeronautic Association honored him in 1969 with the Elder Statesman of Aviation Award.

In 1979, the guided-missile frigate USS Clark (FFG-11) was named in his honor.

== Bibliography ==
- Potter, E. B. (2005). Admiral Arleigh Burke. U.S. Naval Institute Press. ISBN 978-1-59114-692-6.
