= Polish Navy =

- Marynarka Wojenna
- Military eagle
- Founded: 24 March 1568 (Sea Commission); 458 years ago c. 9 November 1626 (Commission of Royal Ships); 400 years ago 28 November 1918 (Polish Navy); 107 years ago
- Country: Poland
- Branch: Navy
- Size: 40+ ships (including auxiliary & support vessels), 8,240 personnel (2025)
- Part of: Polish Armed Forces
- Headquarters: Gdynia
- Engagements: World War II; Cold War; Iraq War

Commanders
- Commander-in-Chief: Karol Nawrocki
- Minister of National Defence: Władysław Kosiniak-Kamysz
- Chief of the General Staff: General Wiesław Kukuła
- General Commander: Gen. Broni Marek Sokołowskii
- Operational Commander: Gen. Dywizji Ireneusz Nowak
- Inspector of the Navy: wadm. Jarosław Ziemiański

Insignia
- Flag

- Naval Ensign

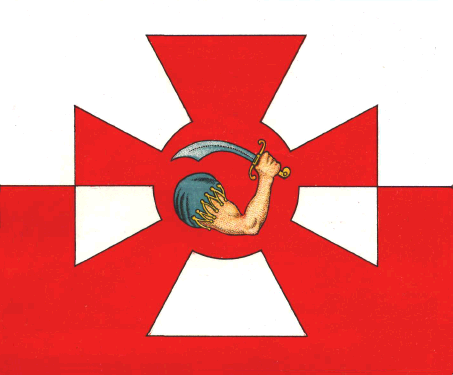
- Naval Jack

The Polish Navy (Polish: Marynarka Wojenna, lit. 'War Navy'; often abbreviated to Marynarka) is the naval branch of the Polish Armed Forces. The Polish Navy consists of 46 ships and about 8000 commissioned and enlisted personnel. The traditional ship prefix in the Polish Navy is ORP (Okręt Rzeczypospolitej Polskiej, 'Warship of the Republic of Poland').

The first Polish naval forces were organized in 1568 following the Thirteen Years' War, but the Polish Navy in its modern form was not created until 1918. Most of Poland's naval forces escaped capture when Germany and the Soviet Union invaded in 1939, and carried on the fight in exile during World War II. During the Cold War, the Polish People's Navy was organized to support the Soviet and East German navies in controlling the Baltic Sea in event of a war with NATO. Since the breakup of the Soviet Union in 1991, and Poland's accession to NATO in 1999, the Polish Navy has reversed its former Cold War role, helping to ensure NATO control of the Baltic Sea.

The Polish Navy is the smallest of Poland's armed services, numbering approximately 8,000 personnel in 2025, but has benefited from significant increases in Poland's defense spending in response to Russia's invasion of Ukraine.

Currently led by Vice Admiral Jarosław Ziemiański, Inspector of the Navy, the Polish Navy is headquartered in Gdynia.

== Origins ==
In 1135 or 1136, a Slavic fleet (comprising Pomeranian, Obotrite, and Polish forces) numbering several hundred warships—under the command of the Pomeranian duke Racibor, a vassal of the Polish ruler Bolesław the Wrymouth—carried out an assault on the Norwegian port city of Konungahela. The expedition was a combined naval and land operation, involving a large-scale amphibious landing of infantry and cavalry, riverine combat against an enemy fleet, and the capture and subsequent sacking of the city. It is interpreted as a political and military demonstration by the Polish ruler.

The Polish Navy has its roots in naval vessels that were largely employed on Poland's main rivers in defense of trade and commerce. During the Thirteen Years' War (1454–66), a small force of ships that primarily operated on rivers and lakes saw real open sea battles for the first time. At the Battle of Vistula Lagoon, a combined fleet of the Kingdom of Poland and the pro-Polish Prussian Confederation decisively defeated the navy of the Teutonic Knights, and secured permanent access to the Baltic Sea. In 1454, the maritime city of Gdańsk was re-incorporated to Poland after being previously occupied by the Teutonic Knights since 1308. The reintegration was confirmed in the Second Peace of Thorn (1466), and Poland acquired the means of maintaining a large fleet on the Baltic. In 1561, following a victory over a Russian fleet in the Baltic, the Polish Navy acquired a second key port at Riga, in modern-day Latvia.

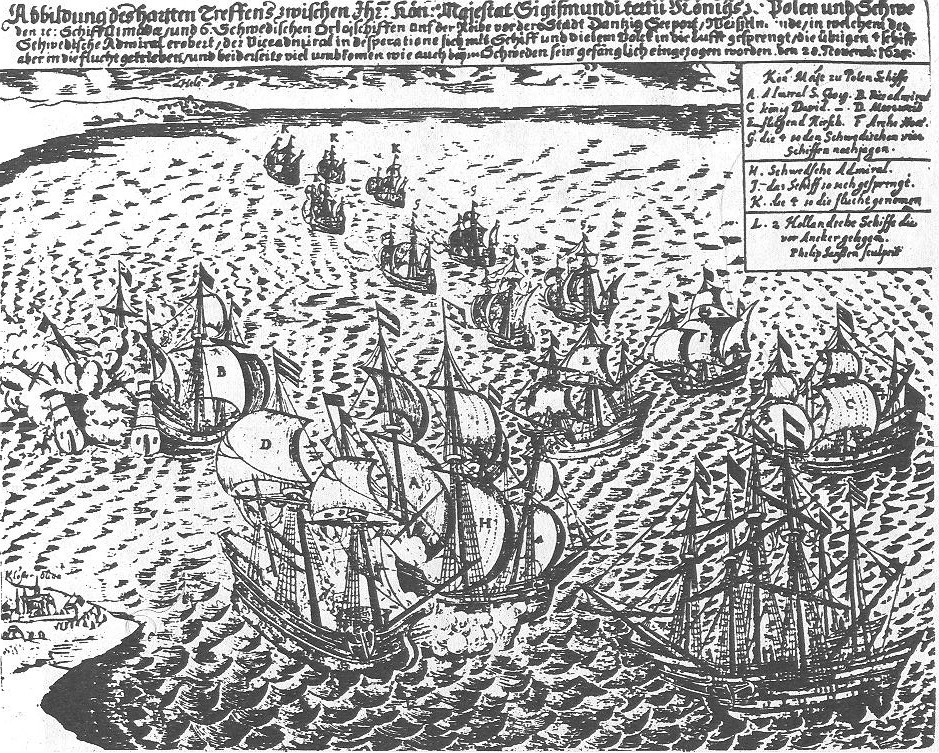
The Battle of Oliwa, fought during the Polish–Swedish War, resulted in a Polish victory on 28 November 1627

At that time, as the Kingdom of Poland and the Grand Duchy of Lithuania (Polish–Lithuanian union) became involved in conflicts in Livonia, Polish king Sigismund II Augustus organized a Sea Commission (Komisja Morska) which operated between 1568 and 1572, and supported the operations of Polish privateers, but that met with opposition of the Poland's primary port, Gdańsk, which saw them as a threat to its trade operations (see Hanseatic League). This led to the development of a privateer port in Puck. Around the start of the 17th century, Poland became ruled by the House of Vasa, and was involved in a series of wars with Sweden (see also dominium maris baltici). The Polish kings of the period attempted to create a proper naval fleet, but their attempts met with repeated failures, due to lack of funds in the royal treasury (Polish nobility saw little need for the fleet and refused to raise taxes for its construction, and Gdańsk continued its opposition to the idea of a royal fleet). The Commission of Royal Ships (Komisja Okrętów Królewskich) was officially created in 1626 during the reign of Sigismund III of Poland. The most celebrated victory of the Commonwealth Navy took place at the Battle of Oliwa in 1627 against the Swedish Empire, during the Polish–Swedish War. The victory over the Swedish fleet secured for Poland permanent access to the Baltic, and laid the foundations for potential expeditions beyond Europe. The plans for the permanent naval fleet fell through shortly afterwards due to a badly executed alliance with the Habsburgs who in 1629 forcibly took over the fleet.

The Commission of Royal Ships, along with the ultimate allocation of funds by the Sejm in 1637, created a permanent Commonwealth Navy. Władysław IV Vasa, Sigismund's son and successor who took the throne in 1632, purchased 12 ships and built a dedicated port for the royal navy called Władysławowo. The fleet, however, was entirely destroyed in 1637 by Denmark-Norway, despite the Danish not issuing a formal declaration of war. Support for the idea of a Polish-Lithuanian navy was weak and it largely withered away by the 1640s; the remaining ships were sold in the years 1641–1643, which marked the end of the Commonwealth Navy. A small navy was also created by Augustus II the Strong in 1700 during the Great Northern War. The Polish–Lithuanian Commonwealth, though the dominant force in Central and Eastern Europe during the 16th–18th centuries, never developed its navy to its full potential. The proportionally small Polish coastline and the limited access to the Atlantic never allowed for a massive buildup of naval forces to the level of maritime great powers such as the Kingdom of Great Britain and the Kingdom of France. The Partitions of Poland at the end of the 18th century brought an end to the possibility of an independent Polish Navy.

== 20th century ==
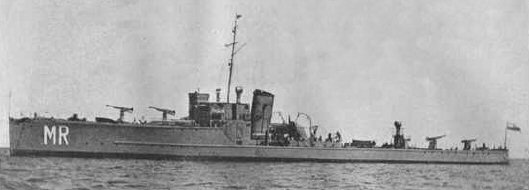
Torpedo boat ORP Mazur, one of the Polish Navy's first ships after World War I

Following World War I, the Second Polish Republic on 28 November 1918, by the order of Józef Piłsudski, commander of the Armed Forces of Poland, founded the modern Polish Navy. The small naval force was placed under the command of Captain Bogumił Nowotny as its first chief. The first ships, which included several torpedo boats, were acquired from the former Imperial German Navy. In the 1920s and 1930s the Polish Navy underwent a modernisation program under the leadership of Vice-Admiral Jerzy Świrski (Chief of Naval Staff) and Rear-Admiral Józef Unrug (CO of the Fleet).

A number of modern ships were built in France, the Netherlands, and the United Kingdom. Despite ambitious plans (including 2 cruisers and 12 destroyers), the budgetary limitations placed on the government by the Great Depression never allowed the navy to expand beyond a small Baltic force. The building of one submarine, ORP Orzeł, was partly funded by a public collection. One of the main goals of the Polish Navy was to protect the Polish coast against the Soviet Baltic Fleet, therefore it put emphasis on fast submarines, large and heavily armed destroyers and mine warfare. By September 1939 the Polish Navy consisted of 5 submarines, 4 destroyers, 1 big minelayer and various smaller support vessels and mine-warfare ships. This force was no match for the larger Kriegsmarine, and so a strategy of harassment and indirect engagement was implemented.

=== World War II ===
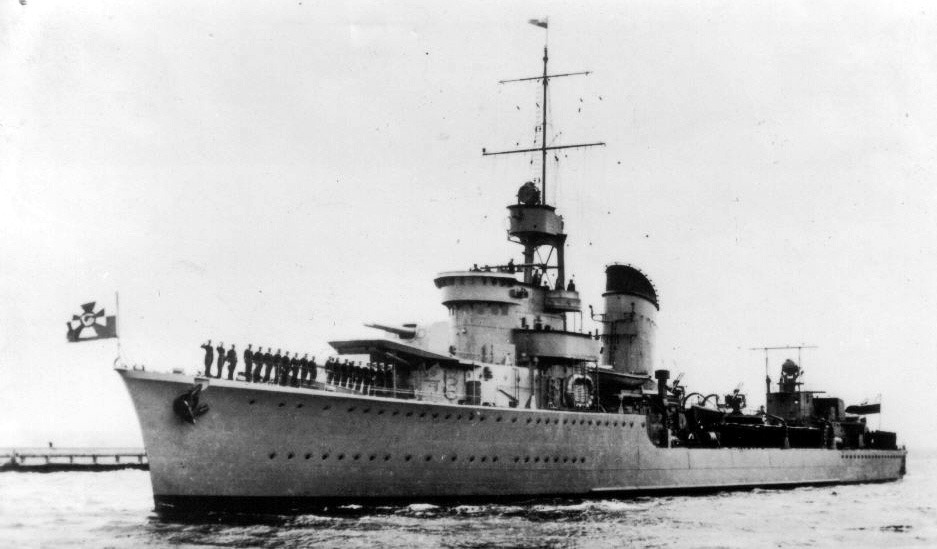
ORP Grom, a World War II Polish Navy destroyer

The outbreak of World War II caught the Polish Navy in a state of expansion. Lacking numerical superiority, Polish Naval commanders decided to withdraw main surface ships to Great Britain to join the Allied war effort and prevent them from being destroyed in a closed Baltic (the Peking Plan). On 30 August 1939, three destroyers, (ORP Błyskawica, ORP Grom, and ORP Burza) sailed to the British naval base at Leith in Scotland. They then operated in combination with Royal Navy vessels against Germany. Also two submarines managed to flee from the Baltic Sea through the Danish Straits to Great Britain during the Polish September Campaign (one of them, ORP Orzeł, made a daring escape from internment in Tallinn, Estonia, and traveled without charts). Three submarines were interned in Sweden, while remaining surface vessels were sunk by German aircraft.

The coastal defense subordinated to the Polish Navy fought as one of the longest defending forces in Poland until October 2, 1939. During the 32-day defense, the Hel Fortified Area and the Heliodor Laskowski's Artillery battery were of great importance.

During the war the Polish Navy in exile was supplemented with leased British ships, including two cruisers (ORP Conrad, ex-HMS Danae; ORP Dragon, ex-HMS Dragon), seven destroyers (one of which was ORP Piorun). three submarines, and a number of smaller fast-attack vessels. The Polish Navy fought alongside the Allied navies in Norway, the North Sea, the Atlantic and the Mediterranean, and aided in the escort of Atlantic and Arctic convoys, in which ORP Orkan was lost in 1943. Polish naval vessels played a part in the sinking of the German battleship Bismarck, and in the landings in Normandy during D-Day. During the course of the war, one cruiser, four destroyers, one minelayer, one torpedo boat, two submarines and some smaller vessels (gunboats, mine hunters etc.) were sunk; in total, twenty-six ships were lost, mostly in September 1939. In addition to participating in the sinking of Bismarck, the Polish Navy sank an enemy destroyer and six other surface ships, two submarines and a number of merchant vessels.

=== Postwar ===
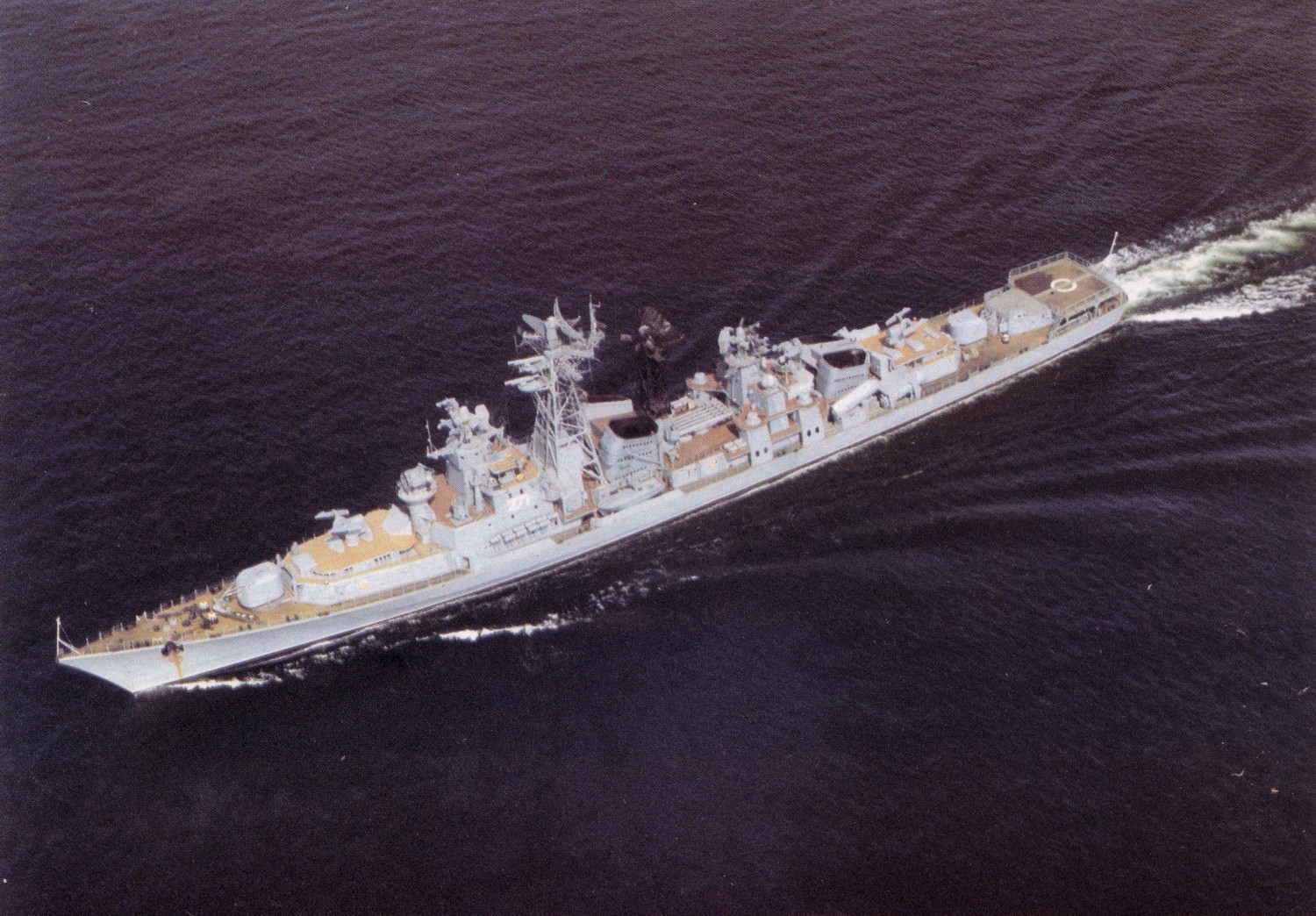
ORP Warszawa was a Kashin-class guided missile destroyer

After World War II, on 7 July 1945, the new communist government revived the Polish Navy with headquarters in Gdynia. During the Communist period, Poland's navy experienced a great build-up, including the development of a separate amphibious force of Polish Marines. The Navy also acquired a number of Soviet-made ships, including 2 destroyers, 2 missile destroyers, 13 submarines and 17 missile boats. Among them was a Kilo-class submarine, ORP Orzeł and a modified Kashin-class missile destroyer, (ORP Warszawa). Polish shipyards produced mostly landing craft, minesweepers and auxiliary vessels. The primary role of the Warsaw Pact Polish Navy was to be Baltic Sea control, as well as amphibious operations along the entire Baltic coastline against NATO forces in Denmark and West Germany. The collapse of the Soviet Union, the dissolution of the Warsaw Pact, and the fall of Communism ended this stance.

== 21st century ==
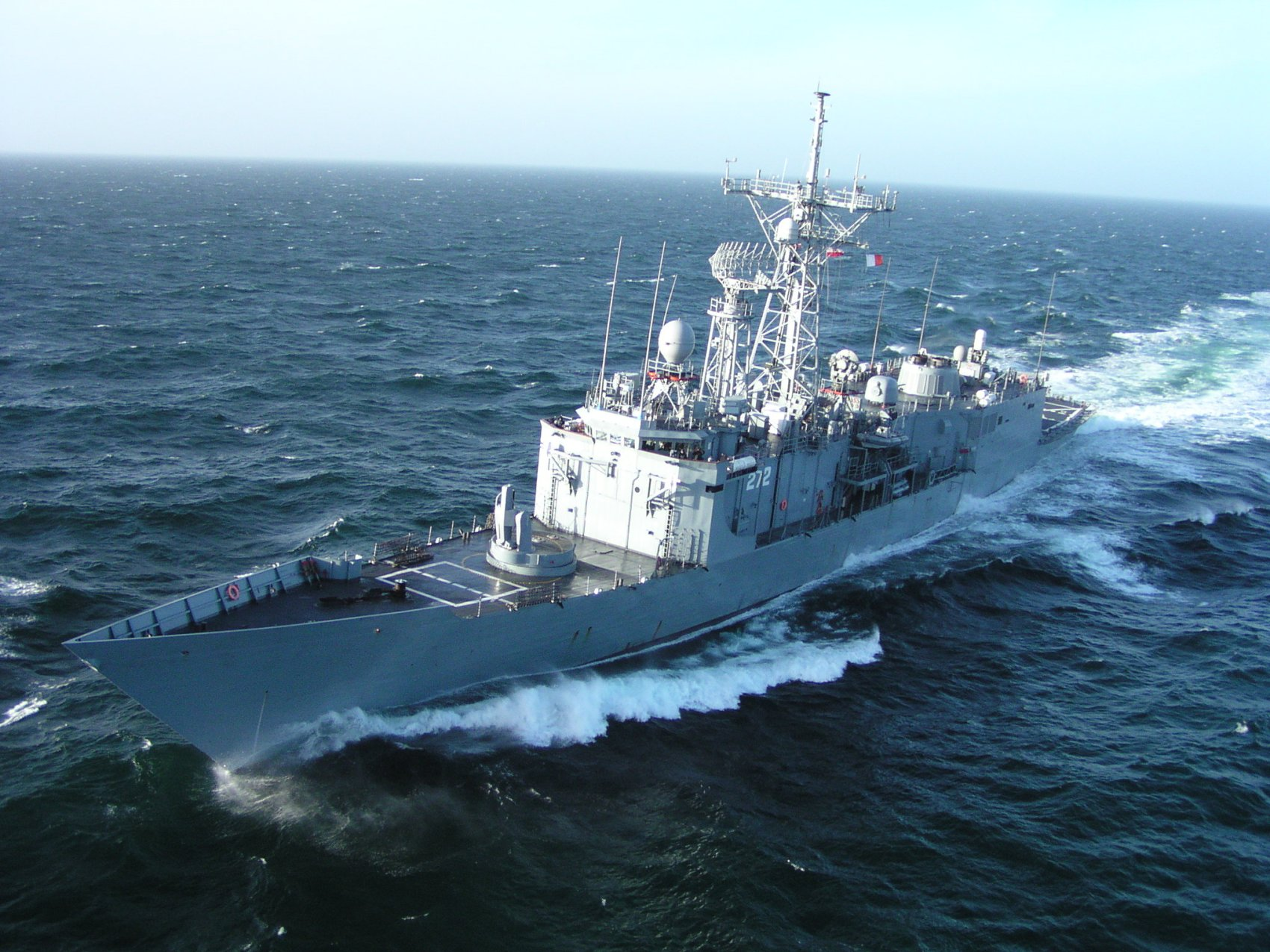
ORP Generał Kazimierz Pułaski is an Oliver Hazard Perry-class frigate

Poland's entrance into the North Atlantic Treaty Organization has greatly changed the structure and role of the Polish Navy. Whereas before, most of Naval High Command was concerned with coastal defense and Baltic Sea Operations, the current mindset is for integration with international naval operations. To facilitate these changes the Republic of Poland undertook a number of modernization programs aimed at creating a force capable of power projection. This included the acquisition of two Oliver Hazard Perry-class frigates from the United States. The Naval air arm has also acquired a number of SH-2G Super Seasprite helicopters. The Polish Navy continues to operate one Kilo-class attack submarine (ORP Orzeł).

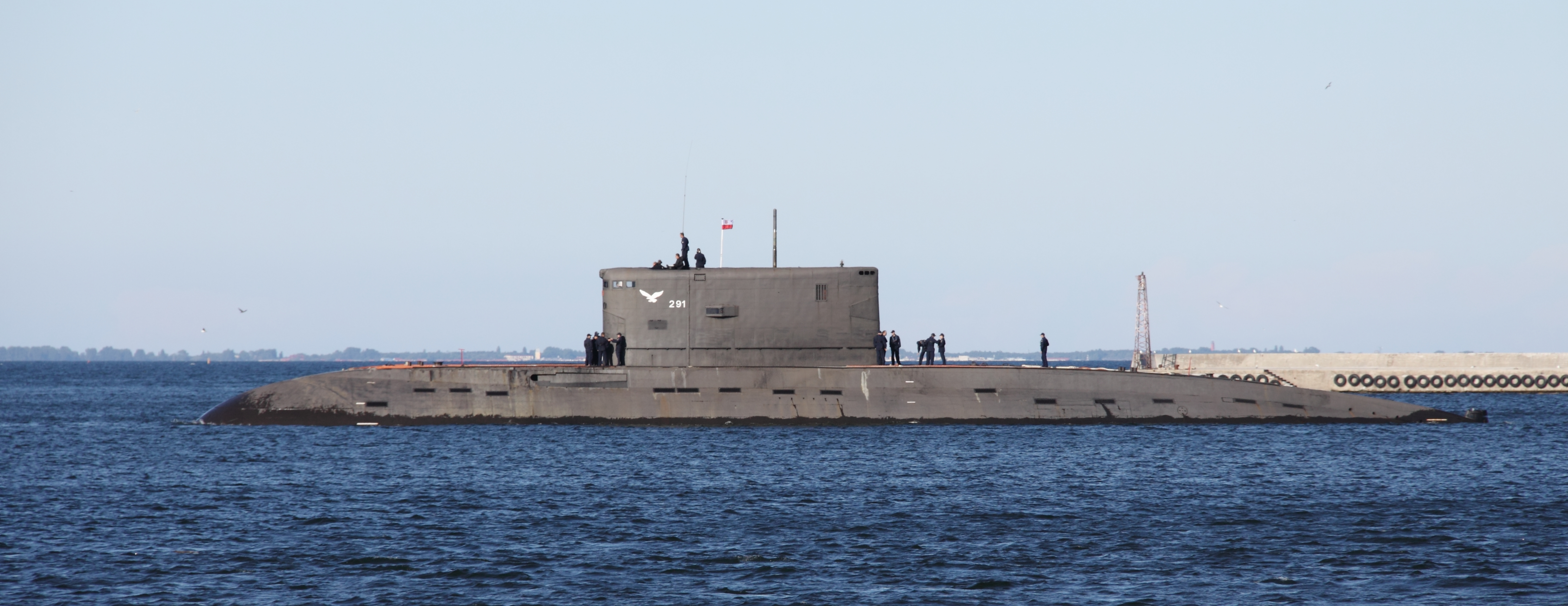
ORP Orzeł is a Kilo-class attack submarine

The Polish Navy has taken part in numerous joint force operations. In 1999 the naval base at Gdynia became the home base of all NATO submarine forces in the Baltic, codenamed "Cooperative Poseidon". That same year joint American-Polish submarine training manoeuvres codenamed "Baltic Porpoise" for the first time utilized the port in a multinational military exercise.

=== Modernization ===
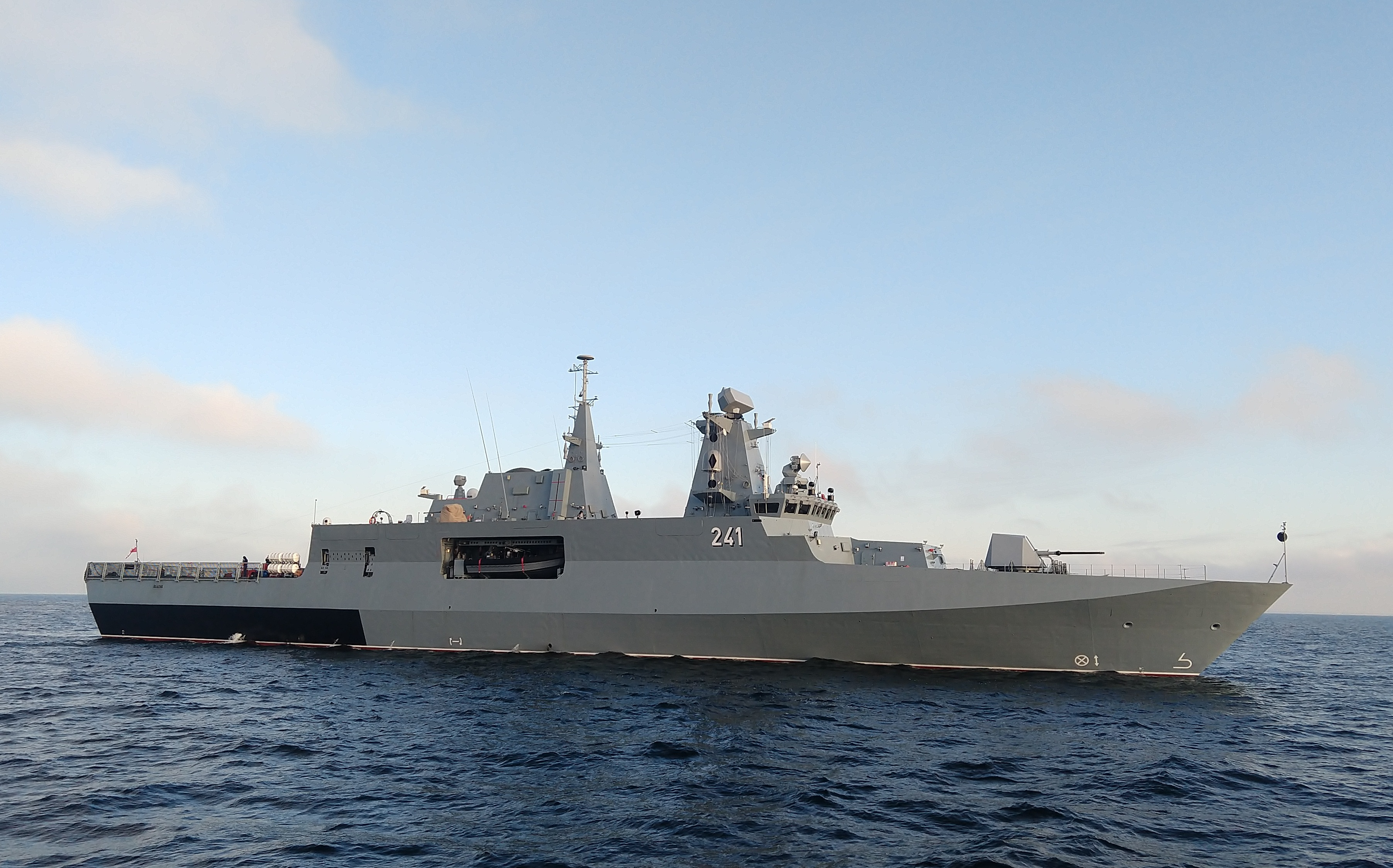
ORP Ślązak is an Gawron-class offshore patrol vessel

As of the 2020s, the Polish Navy is modernizing its fleet. The work was initially planned as a 9 billion zloty project, but this was reduced in 2012 to 5 billion zloty, causing delays and cancellations in the succeeding years. The navy's 2017 strategy called for spending 13 billion zloty and acquiring 22 new warships, including those completed since 2013. In addition, although the force considers larger warships unsuitable for the confines of the Baltic Sea, the strategy called for extending the operational lifespan of one Oliver Hazard Perry-class frigate.

12 new ships worth around 10 billion PLN were to be acquired before 2026. The plan was updated in 2017 for 2013–2022 period to be worth 13 billion zloty and called to acquire 22 new vessels. These included three coast-defense vessels, code name Miecznik, that would feature a displacement of 2600 tons; and three patrol/mine countermeasure vessels, code name Czapla with 1700 tons displacement. Other purchases include six tugboats, two tankers, two rescue ships, one ELINT, one logistical support ship and one joint support ship. However some deliveries are expected up to 2026. On 2 July 2015, ORP Ślązak was christened during official launching ceremony, becoming the first new Polish-built Navy ship in 21 years. In 2022, UK shipbuilder Babcock announced that the Polish Navy had selected its Arrowhead 140 design for its Miecznik program, which will equip the navy with three new-build multi-mission frigates. The vessels are expected to be built locally in Poland.

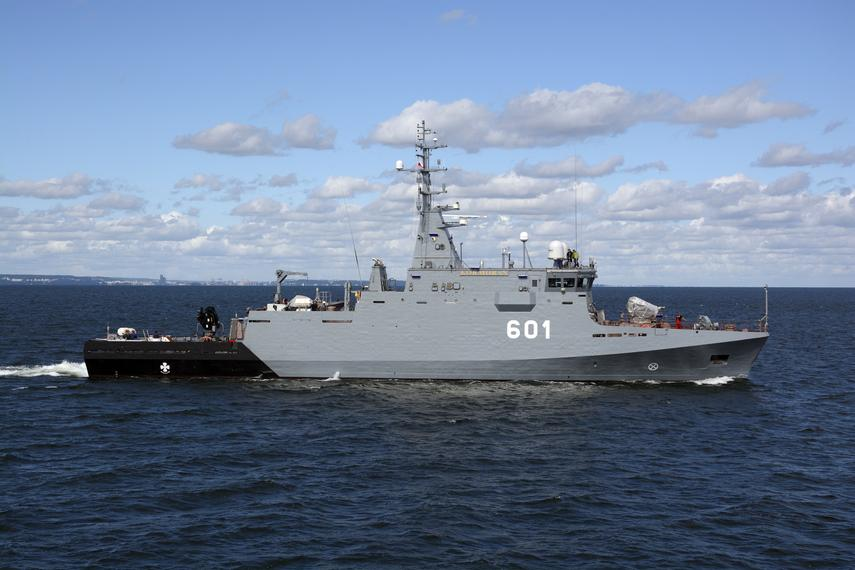
ORP Kormoran is a coastal mine countermeasures vessel

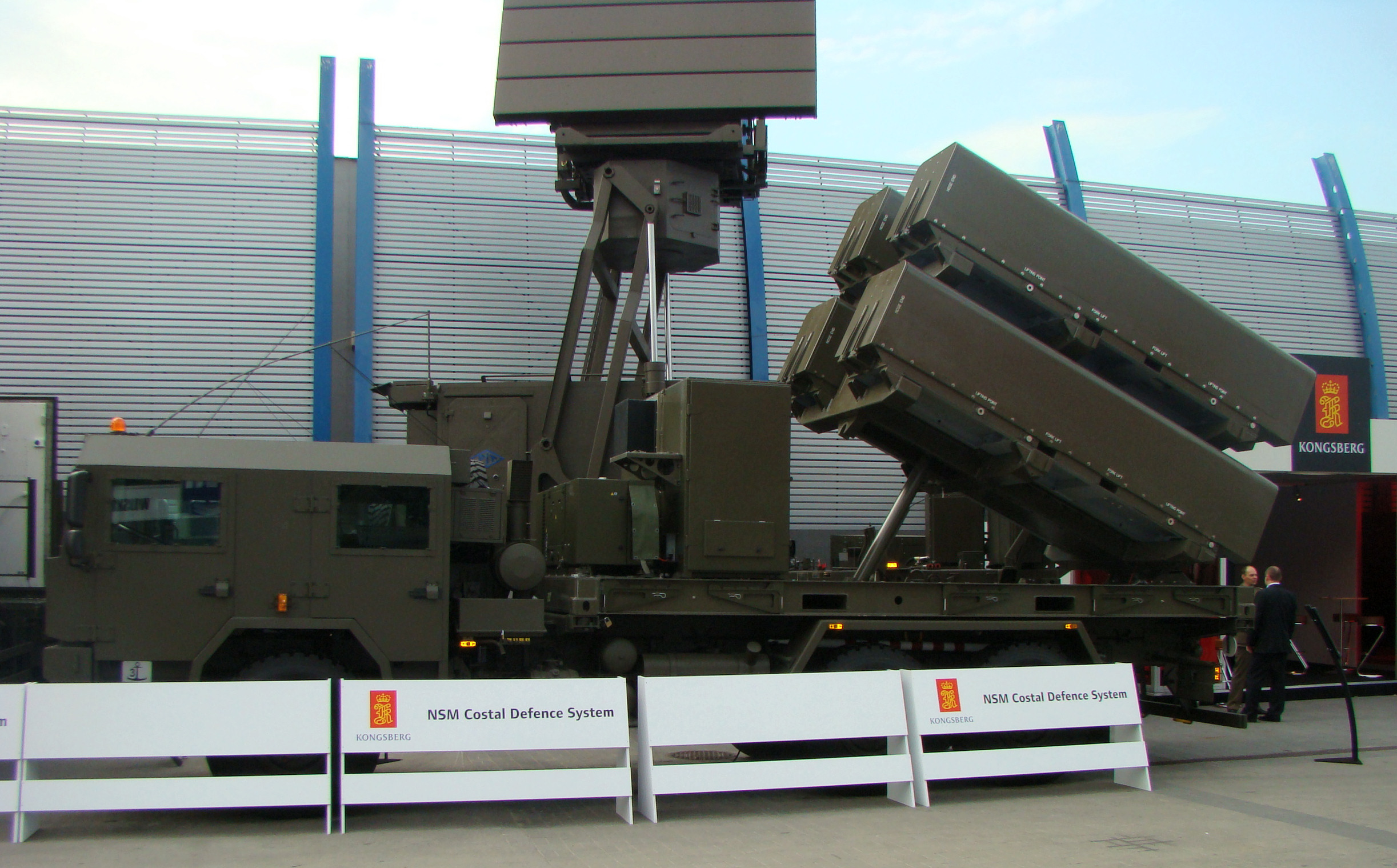
Shore based anti-ship Naval Strike Missile

In terms of armament, the Polish Navy has acquired 36 Swedish RBS15 Mk3. and 50 (50/74) Norwegian Naval Strike Missiles for vessels and coastal defence units. As of 2017, t is planned to reinforce the Navy's helicopter fleet with four to eight ASW/SAR units. The Gawron-class corvettes program was cancelled with the sole surviving unit to be built as a patrol vessel. In June 2013 the Coastal Missile Division (NDR) equipped initially with 12 Naval Strike Missiles and two TRS-15C radars achieved initial readiness.

== Mission and organization ==
The main mission of the Polish Navy is the defense of Poland's territorial waters, coastline and its interests abroad. Other missions include the support of NATO allied operations, and search and rescue operations throughout the Baltic Sea. In addition, the Polish Navy supplies nearly 40 ships as part of the NATO Rapid Reaction Force, designed to be a force projection and conflict response force around the world. The Polish Navy is organized into 2 separate Flotillas and a Naval Air Brigade. Until January 1, 2014 the service had a Chief of the Navy (a three-star Admirał floty) and a Naval Command. On that date the branch-specific Land Forces, Air Forces, Naval and Special Forces Commands were disestablished and combined into two new commands. The functions of the three-star Chief of the Navy were split between two two-star officers (vice-admirals in the Polish system of military ranks) - an Inspector of the Navy under the Armed Forces General Command, responsible for manpower, materiel and combat readiness and a Commander of the Seaborne Component Command, responsible for naval operations.

Polish Navy bases
- Armed Forces Operational Command in Warsaw
  - Seaborne Operations Center - Seaborne Component Command in Gdynia
- Armed Forces General Command in Warsaw
  - Inspector of the Navy in Warsaw
    - 3rd Ship Flotilla "Commodore Bolesław Romanowski" in Gdynia-Oksywie
      - Flotilla Command
      - Submarine Ships Division in Gdynia-Oksywie
        - ORP 291 Orzeł - Kilo-class submarine
      - Gdynia Combatant Ships Division - Gdynia-Oksywie
        - ORP 272 Generał Kazimierz Pułaski and ORP 273 Generał Tadeusz Kościuszko - Oliver Hazard Perry-class frigates
        - ORP 421 Orkan, ORP 422 Piorun and ORP 423 Grom - Orkan-class missile corvettes
        - ORP 240 Kaszub - single ship ASW corvette Project 620
        - ORP 241 Ślązak - single ship multirole corvette Project Meko A-100, being fitted out until the end of 2018
      - Support Ships Division in Gdynia
        - ORP 251 Wodnik - single ship Wodnik-class training vessel Project 888
        - ORP 281 Piast and ORP 282 Lech - Piast-class rescue-salvage ships Project 570
        - ORP R-14 Zbyszko and ORP R-15 Maćko - rescue cutters Project B823
      - Reconnaissance Ships Group in Gdynia
        - ORP 262 Nawigator and ORP 263 Hydrograf - Nawigator-class reconnaissance ships
      - Hydrographic Support Squadron in Gdynia
        - ORP 265 Heweliusz and ORP 266 Arctowski - Heweliusz-class hydrographic survey ships
        - ORP 253 Iskra - Iskra-class sail training ship
        - 2 hydrographic cutters K-4 and K-10 and 3 hydrographic motor launches M-38, M-39 and M-40
      - Coastal ASM Unit "Commodore Zbigniew Przybyszewski" in Siemirowice
        - 1st Coastal ASM Division - Naval Strike Missile
        - 2nd Coastal ASM Division - Naval Strike Missile
      - 9th Anti-Aircraft Division in Ustka - Grom MANPADS and S-60 AAA guns
      - 43rd Naval Combat Engineer Battalion in Rozewie
      - Naval Technical Base in Gdynia
      - Military Port Command "Brig. Gen. Stanisław Dąbek" in Gdynia
        - Base Location Hel
      - Naval Sailing Training Center in Gdynia
      - Naval Control and Measurement Range in Gdynia-Oksywie
      - ORP H34 Błyskawica - Grom-class destroyer museum ship
    - 8th Coastal Defense Flotilla "Vice admiral Kazimierz Porębski" in Świnoujście
      - Flotilla Command
      - 2nd Landing and Minelaying Ships Division in Swinoujscie
        - ORP 821 Lublin, ORP 822 Gniezno, ORP 823 Kraków, ORP 824 Poznań and ORP 825 Toruń - Lublin-class minelayer-landing ships
        - ORP 511 Kontradmirał Xawery Czernicki - multirole support ship
        - 3 landing cutters Project 716
      - 12th Wolin Minesweeper Division in Swinoujscie
        - ORP 631 Gardno, ORP 632 Bukowo, ORP 633 Dąbie, ORP 634 Jamno, ORP 635 Mielno, ORP 636 Wicko, ORP 637 Resko, ORP 638 Sarbsko, ORP 639 Necko, ORP 640 Nakło, ORP 641 Drużno, ORP 642 Hańcza - Gardno-class minesweepers Project 207P
        - TR-25 and TR-26 - minesweeping cutters Project B410-IVS
        - EOD Diver Group
      - 13th Minesweeper Division "Fleet Admiral Andrzej Karweta" in Gdynia
        - ORP 624 Czajka - minehunter Project 206FM
        - ORP 601 Kormoran - minehunter Project 258
        - ORP 630 Gopło, ORP 643 Mamry, ORP 644 Wigry, ORP 645 Śniardwy, ORP 646 Wdzydze - coastal minesweepers Project 207M
        - EOD Diver Group
      - 8th Anti-Aircraft Division in Dziwnów - Grom MANPADS, ZU-23-2 and S-60 AAA guns
      - 8th Kołobrzeg Naval Combat Engineer Battalion in Dziwnów
      - Military Port Command Swinoujscie
        - Base Location Kołobrzeg
    - Gdynia Naval Aviation Brigade "Commander Pilot Karol Trzask-Durski" in Gdynia-Babie Doły
      - Brigade Command
      - 43rd Oksywie Naval Air Base "Commander Edward Stanisław Szystowiski" in Gdynia-Babie Doły (personnel and equipment from 28th Naval Aviation Squadron)
        - Air Group
          - 4 transport aircraft An-28TD (0703 and 1003) and M28B (1117 and 1118)
          - 4 shipborne ASW helicopters Kaman SH-2G Super Seasprite (3543, 3544, 3545 and 3546)
          - 6 SAR helicopters W-3WARM Anakonda (0505, 0506, 0511, 0813, 0815 and 0906)
          - 2 training and liaison helicopters Mi-2D (5245) and Mi-2R (5348)
      - 44th Kaszubian-Darłowo Naval Air Base in Siemirowice
        - Kaszubian Air Group in Siemirowice
          - 7 maritime patrol aircraft M28B-1R Bryza M28B-1R (1006, 1008, 1017, 1022, 1114, 1115 and 1116)
          - 1 maritime patrol and submarine detection aircraft M28B-1RM/BIS Bryza (0810)
          - 2 environmental monitoring aircraft An-28E (0404 and 0405)
        - Darłowo Air Group in Darłowo
          - 2 SAR helicopters Mi-14PŁ/R (1009 and 1012)
          - 8 ASW helicopters Mi-14PŁ (1001, 1003, 1004, 1005, 1007, 1008, 1010 and 1011)
          - 2 SAR helicopters W-3WARM Anakonda (0209 and 0304)
          - 2 training and liaison helicopters Mi-2R (5828 and 5830)
    - Naval Hydrographical Bureau in Gdynia
    - 6th Oliwa Radioelectronic Reconnaissance Regiment ″Admiral Arendt Dickmann″
    - Naval Training Center "Vice Admiral Józef Unrug" in Ustka
    - Naval NCO School in Ustka
    - Diving and Deep Diving Training Center of the Polish Armed Forces "Commodore Stanisław Mielczarek" in Gdynia

== Ranks and insignia ==
Officers

NATO code	OF-10	OF-9	OF-8	OF-7	OF-6	OF-5	OF-4	OF-3	OF-2	OF-1
Polish Navy
Polish Navy	Marszałek Polski	Admirał	Admirał floty	Wiceadmirał	Kontradmirał	Komandor	Komandor porucznik	Komandor podporucznik	Kapitan marynarki	Porucznik marynarki	Podporucznik marynarki

Other ranks

NATO code	OR-9		OR-8	OR-7	OR-6	OR-5	OR-4	OR-3		OR-2	OR-1
Polish Navy												No insignia
Polish Navy	Starszy chorąży sztabowy marynarki	Starszy chorąży marynarki	Chorąży marynarki		Młodszy chorąży marynarki	Starszy bosman	Bosman	Bosmanmat	Starszy mat	Mat	Starszy marynarz	Marynarz

== Equipment ==
=== Aircraft ===
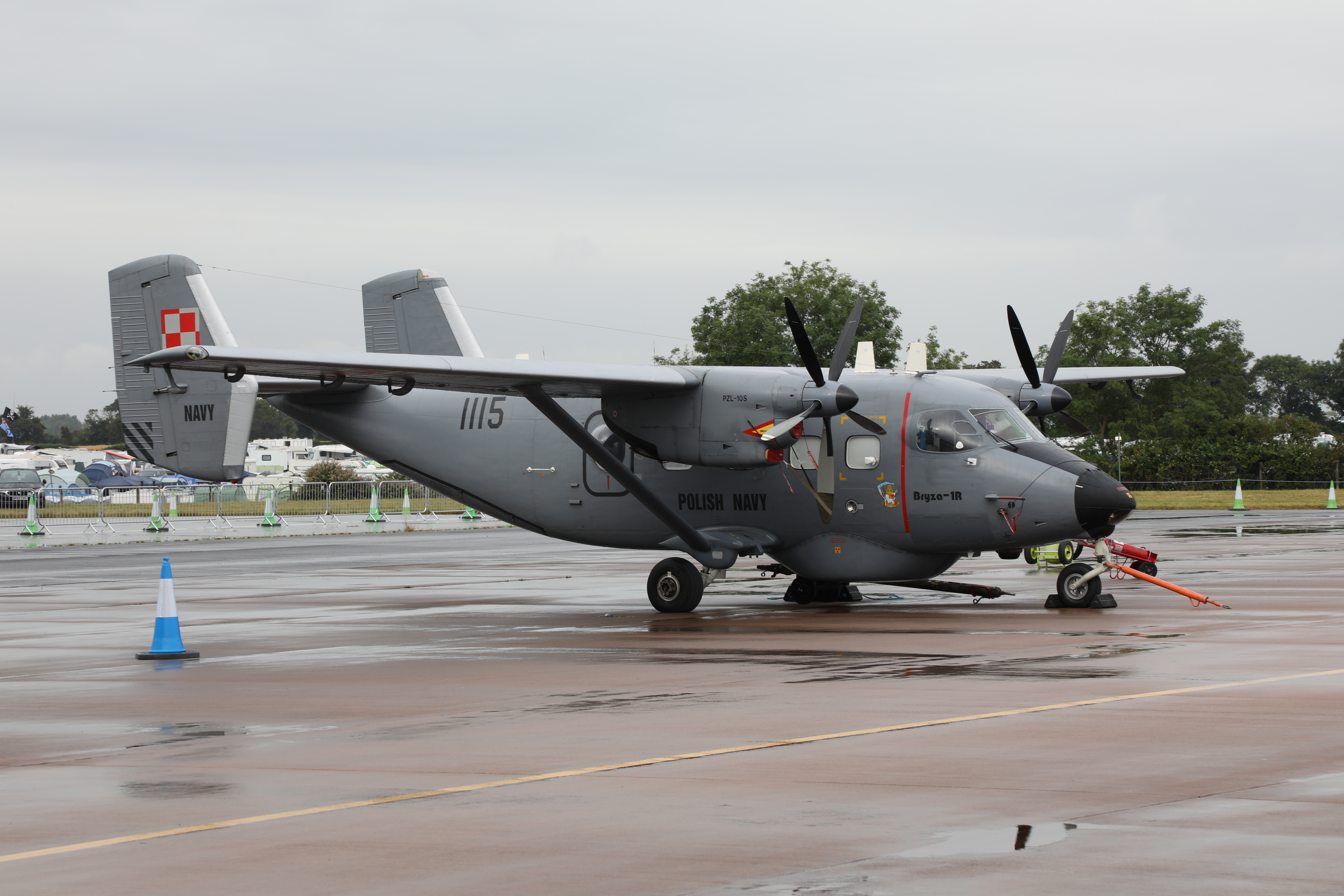
PZL M28B 1R Bryza

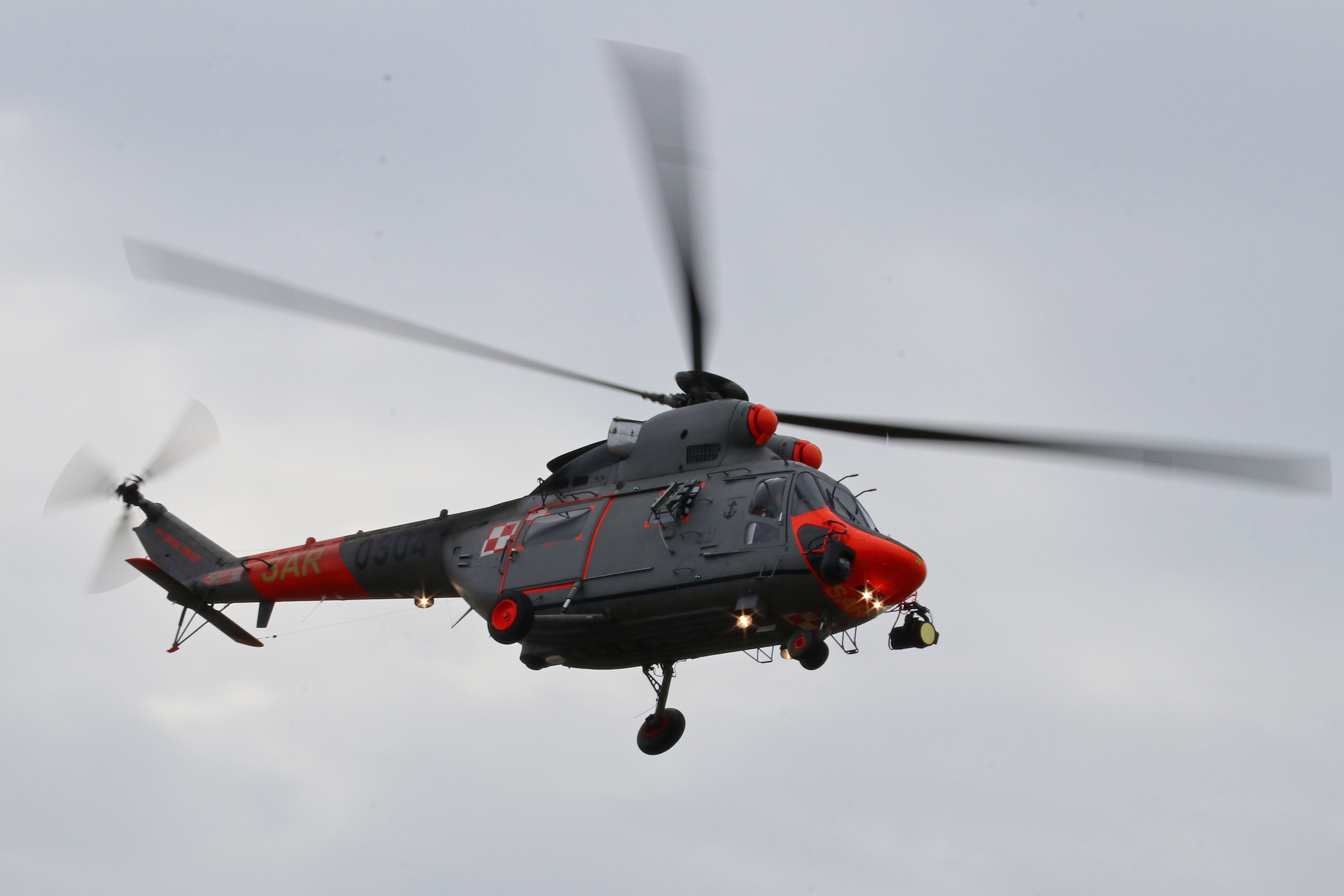
W-3 WARM Anakonda

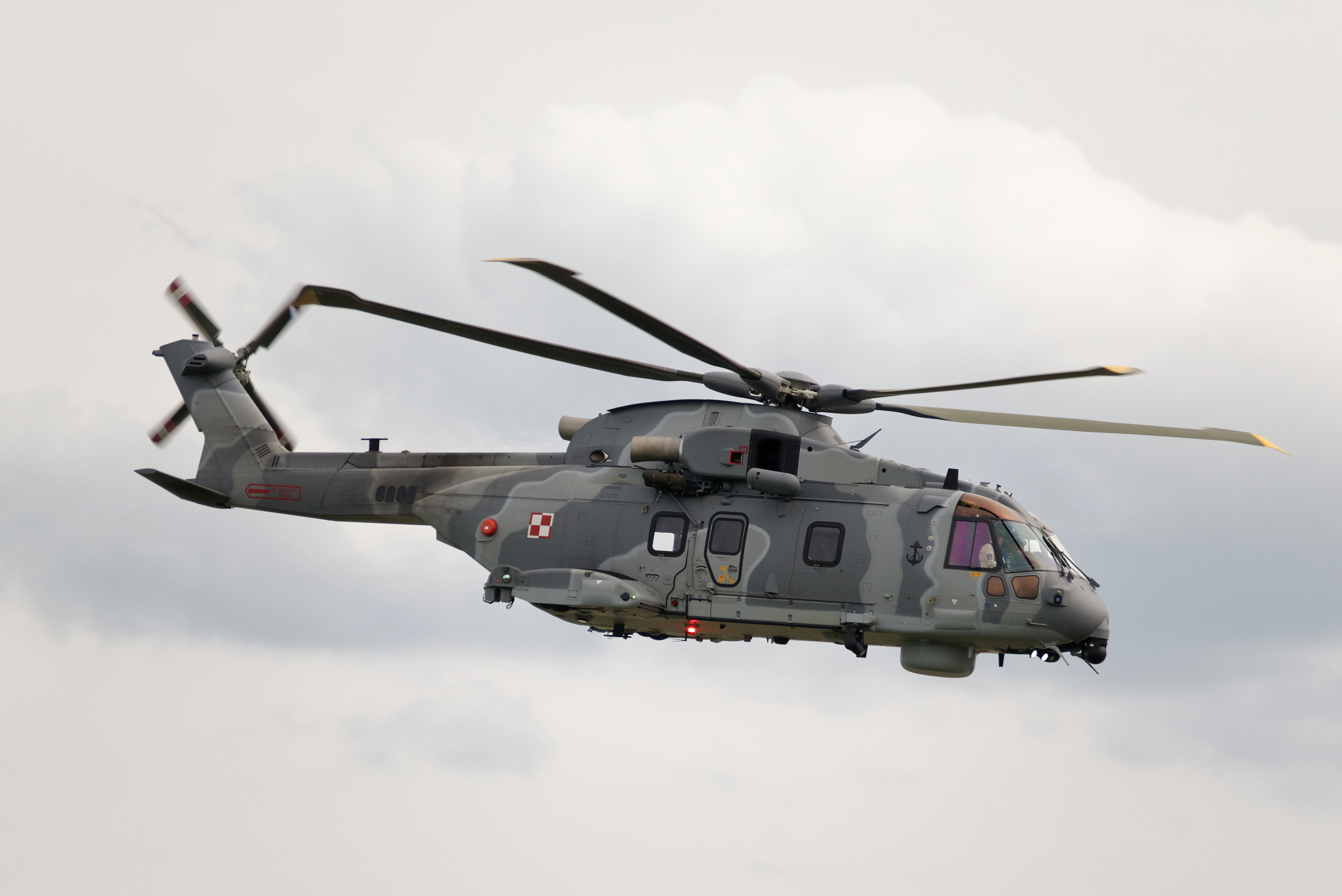
AW-101 (Merlin Mk614)

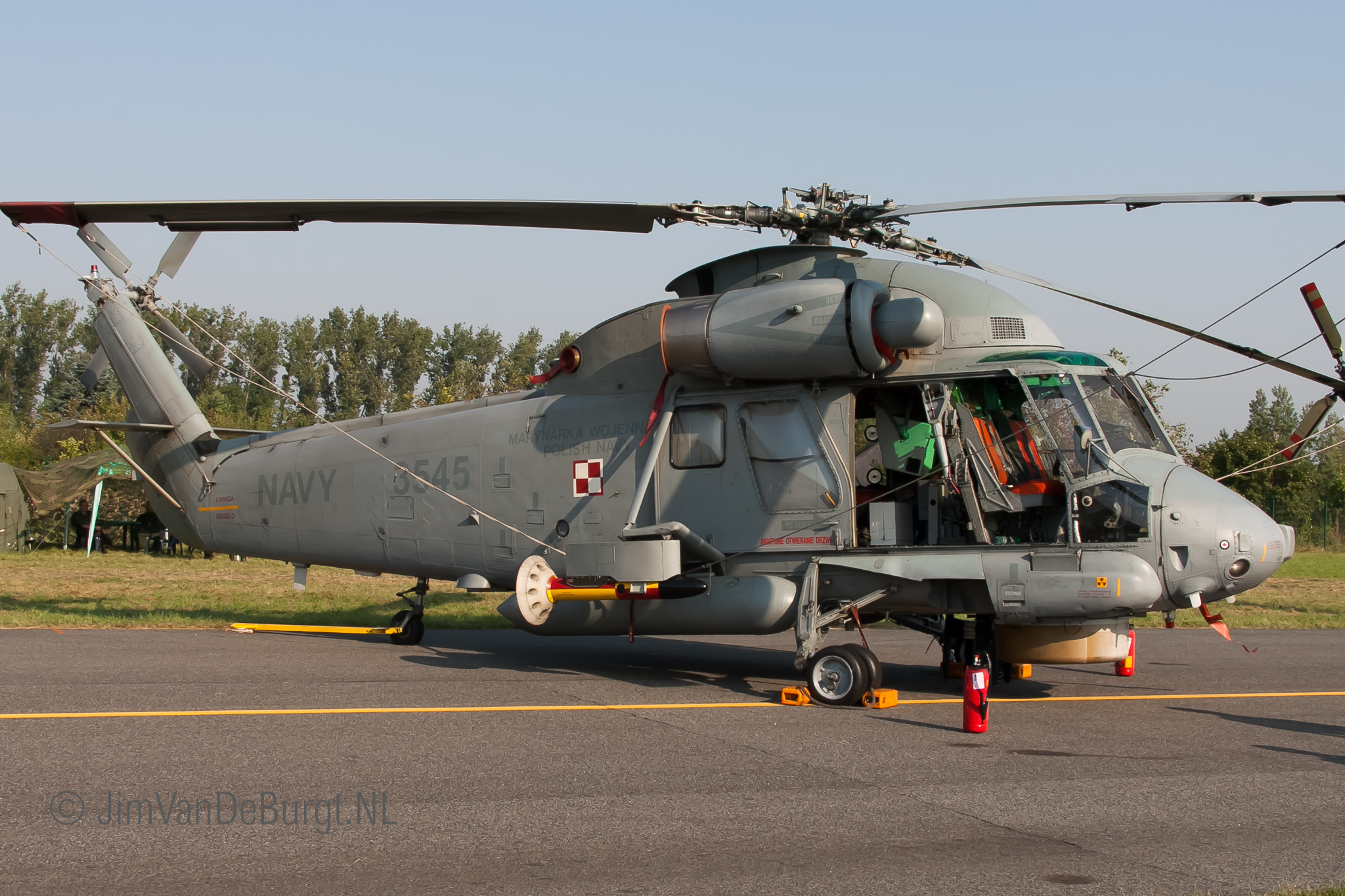
Kaman SH-2G Super Seasprite

Aircraft	Origin	Type	Variant	In service	Notes
Maritime patrol
An-28 / PZL M28	Poland	Maritime patrol	An-28/M28 (MPA)	9	
Transport
An-28 / PZL M28	Poland	Light transport	—	5	
Helicopters
AW-101	United Kingdom Italy	ASW / Transport	Merlin Mk614	3	Replacement of Mil Mi-14; 1 on order
PZL Mi-2	Poland	Search and rescue		3	
PZL W-3 Sokół	Poland	Search and rescue	PZL W-3WARM SAR	8	

=== Coastal Defense ===
==== Current equipment ====
Model	Origin	Image	Type	In service	Notes
Division
NSM CDS division Naval Strike Missile Coastal Defence System	Norway	Polish Naval Strike Missile	Coastal defence missile system	2	1 squadron ordered in 2008 1 additional squadron ordered in 2014 Each squadron is made of 2 batteries.
Composition of a division
NSM - BCV Naval Strike Missile - Battery Command Vehicle		—	Battery command	4	Installed on Jelcz 662D43 6×6 truck. 1 per battery, 2 per squadron
TRS-15C - MRV Mobile Radar Vehicle	Poland	Polish Naval Strike Missile	Radar	4	Installed on a Jelcz P882 8×8 truck 1 per battery, 2 per squadron
NSM - MLV Naval Strike Missile - Mobile Launch Vehicle	Norway; Poland	Polish Naval Strike Missile	Transporter erector launcher	12	Installed on Jelcz 662D43 6×6 truck. 4 missiles per launcher. 3 per battery, 6 per squadron
NSM - CCV Naval Strike Missile - Combat Command Vehicle	—	Polish Naval Strike Missile	Fire control	12	Installed on Jelcz 662D35 6×6 truck. 3 per battery, 6 per squadron
NSM - MCC Naval Strike Missile - Mobile Communication Center	—	—	Mobile communication center	4	Installed on Jelcz 662D43 6×6 truck. 1 per battery, 2 per squadron
NSM - TLV Naval Strike Missile - Transport Loading Vehicle	—	—	Transport and loading vehicle	2	1 per squadron
NSM - MWV Naval Strike Missile - Mobile Workshop Vehicle	—	—	Mobile workshop vehicle	2	1 per squadron
NSM missile Block 1A Naval Strike Missile	Norway	Polish Naval Strike Missile	Anti-Ship Missile	74	50 missiles ordered in 2008 and 2011 (including 2 for testing) 24 ordered with the launchers in 2014

==== On order ====
Two additional squadrons of NSM CDS were ordered in 2023, with a delivery planned for 2026 - 2032. Hundreds of missiles are on order.

== See also ==
- List of Polish admirals
- Polish contribution to World War II (Navy)
- Polish Navy order of battle in 1939
- Polish Merchant Navy
- Polish Border Guard Vessels

== Bibliography ==
- Belcarz, Bartlomiej & Peczkowski, Robert (2001). White Eagles: The Aircraft, Men and Operations of the Polish Air Force 1918–1939. Ottringham, UK: Hikoki Publications. ISBN 1-902109-73-2.
- Peszke, Michael Alfred, Poland's Navy: 1918–1945, New York, Hippocrene Books, 1999, ISBN 0-7818-0672-0.
