= ORP Flaming =

Polish minesweeper

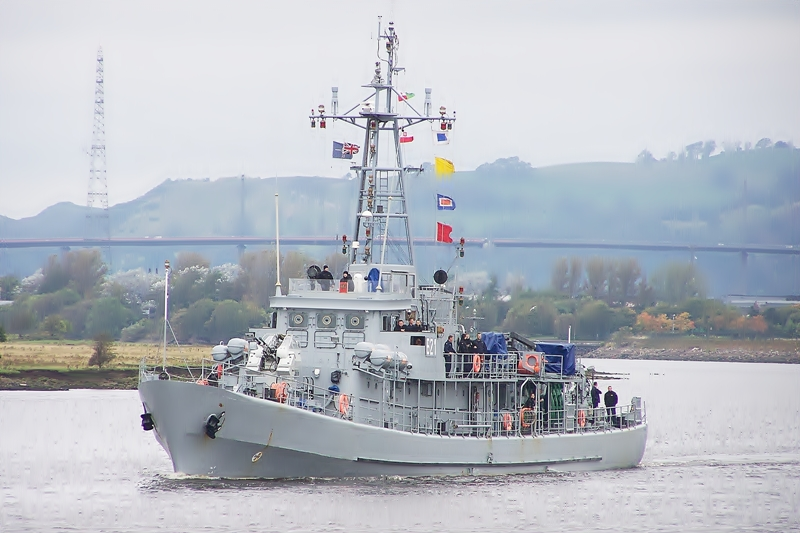
- ORP Flaming after reconstruction in 2011

History

Poland
- Name: ORP Flaming
- Builder: Stocznia Gdynia
- Laid down: January 7, 1966
- Launched: May 5, 1966
- Commissioned: September 27, 1966
- Decommissioned: December 4, 2020

General characteristics
- Class & type: minesweeper, minehunter
- Type: Orlik-class minesweeper, projekt 206FM-class minehunter
- Displacement: standard: 426 t (419 long tons); full: 470 t (460 long tons)
- Length: 58.2 m (190 ft 11 in)
- Draft: 2.14 m (7 ft 0 in)
- Propulsion: 2 Fiat 2312 SS diesel engines with a total power of 2,648 kW (3,600 hp); 2 propellers
- Speed: 18.4 kn (34.1 km/h; 21.2 mph)
- Range: 2,000 nmi (3,700 km; 2,300 mi) at a speed of 17 kn (31 km/h; 20 mph)
- Complement: 49
- Sensors & processing systems: sonar Tamir-11M; radar Lin-M; identification friend or foe Kremnij-2; direction finding receiver ARP-50–1.2M
- Armament: original: 6 x 25 mm 2M-3M guns (3 x twin-mounted), 2 depth charge throwers, from 10 to 16 mines; after reconstruction: 2 x 23 mm ZU-23-2MR guns (1 x twin-mounted), 9K32 Strela-2M anti-aircraft missile launchers, from 6 to 12 mines

ORP Flaming was a Polish base minesweeper from the Cold War era, one of 12 ships of Orlik-class, rebuilt between 2000 and 2001 into a minehunter (Projekt 206FM). The vessel measured 58.2 meters in length, 7.97 meters in width, and had a draft of 2.14 meters, with a full displacement of 470 tons. It was armed with three twin-mounted 25 mm 2M-3M automatic guns and depth charges, and was also equipped to carry and deploy naval mines.

The ship was launched on 5 May 1966 at Stocznia Gdynia, and was commissioned into the Polish Navy on September 27 of the same year. Designated with the pennant number 621, the vessel initially served in the 13th Minesweeper Division of the 9th Coastal Defense Flotilla in Hel. After the division's disbandment in 2006, it was reassigned to the 8th Coastal Defence Flotilla. ORP Flaming served in NATO's standing mine countermeasure groups four times and participated in numerous international exercises, clearing dangerous remnants of World War II in both Polish and foreign waters. After years of intensive service, the ship was decommissioned in December 2020.

== Design and construction ==
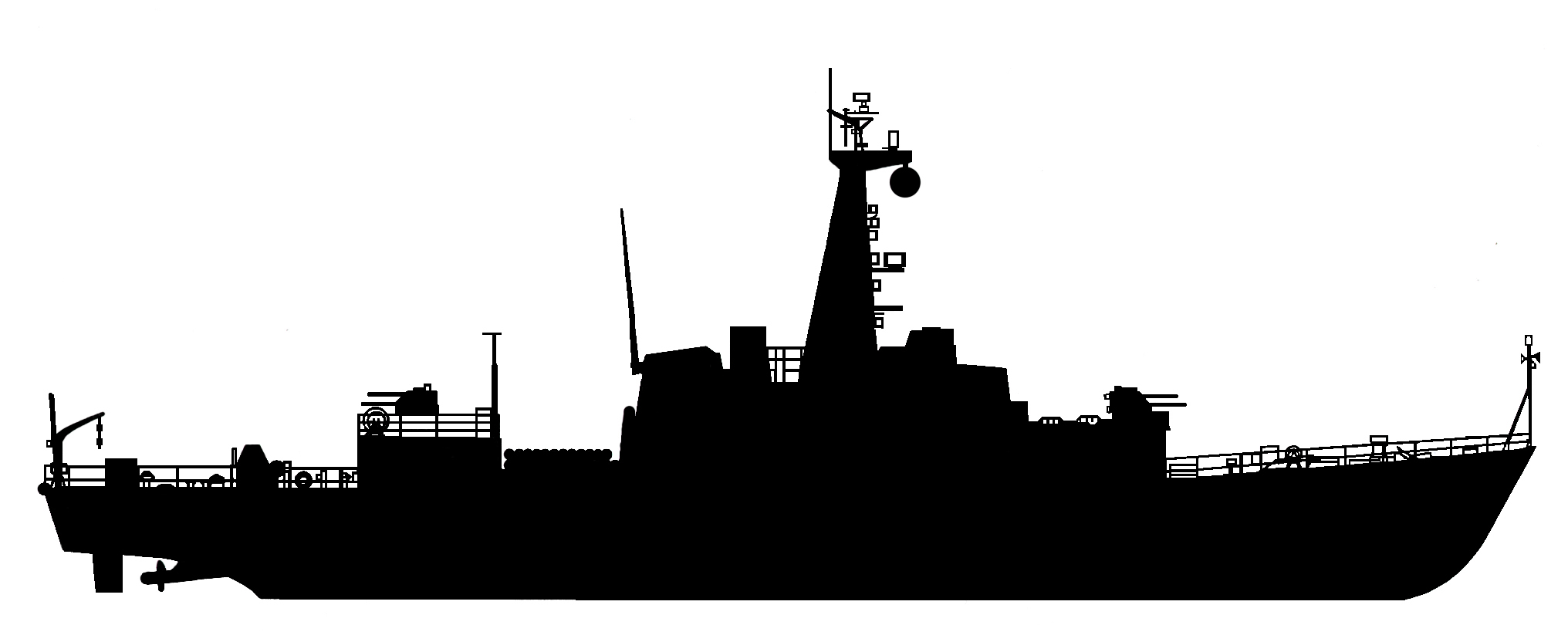
Silhouette of the Projekt 206F minesweeper

Work on a new type of minesweeper began at the Central Ship Design Bureau No. 2 in Gdańsk in 1958 to replace the Projekt 253Ł minesweepers, which had been in service since 1946. Initially, the new vessels were intended to be roadstead minesweepers, capable of conducting both contact and non-contact mine clearance operations in the vicinity of naval bases and laying small minefields. These ships were to have a displacement of approximately 200 tons, a speed of 18 knots, a range of 3,000 nautical miles, and armament consisting of two 45 mm guns and four 14.5 mm heavy machine guns, with mine clearance equipment standard for the late 1950s. Simultaneously, the Navy Command issued requirements for a new base minesweeper with a displacement of 570 tons, despite ongoing preparations for the licensed production of Soviet T43-class minesweepers. Under the leadership of engineer Henryk Andrzejewski, Central Ship Design Bureau No. 2 prepared both the design for a roadstead minesweeper (designated Projekt 206) and four designs for larger base minesweepers (Projekts 250–253). After much debate, it was decided to halt work on the Projekt 250–253 base minesweepers in favor of converting the Projekt 206 vessel into a base minesweeper. In 1959, Central Ship Design Bureau No. 2 developed a modified minesweeper design with a displacement of 425 tons, powered by Italian Fiat diesel engines, as no suitable propulsion units were being produced in socialist countries. (Note: Initially, it was planned to use Dutch RHUB 215 diesel engines with a power of 1,500 hp to power the minesweepers; however, a license could not be obtained for them (similarly to the Fiat engines, of which 24 units were ultimately purchased for a total of 2.4 million USD) (Kamiński (2008a, pp. 25–27)).) The project (designated B206F) (Note: The letter F in the project designation likely symbolizes the Fiat engines used to power the minesweepers (Ciślak (1995, p. 91)).) was approved for implementation in December 1959 by the Minister of National Defense, but the final technical design was not approved by the Navy Command until 19 February 1962. The documentation costs amounted to 1.7 million PLN, the construction of the prototype (the future Orlik) cost 80 million PLN, and the cost of a serial ship was 65.5 million PLN. The unit's annual operational limit was set at 700 hours, with the structure's lifespan estimated at 20 years.

ORP Flaming was built at Stocznia Gdynia (yard number 206F/9). Military oversight of the construction was carried out by Lieutenant Commander Konstanty Cudny. The shipyard used a method of building the vessel's hull from sections joined on the slipway, a technique previously developed for the mass production of fishing trawlers. The keel of the ship was laid on 7 January 1966, and it was launched on 5 May 1966. The minesweeper was given the traditional name for Polish mine warfare vessels, taken from a bird. The ship's godmother was Joanna Tor-Miszczak.

== Tactical and technical data ==
The ship was a smooth-deck, ocean-going minesweeper designed for operation in conditions of partial ice cover. The overall length was 58.2 meters, width was 7.97 meters, and draft was 2.14 meters. The side height measured 4 meters. Constructed from steel, the vessel's fully welded hull was reinforced to increase resistance to underwater explosions. It was divided into seven watertight compartments: (from the bow): I – forecastle (bosun's store, ship's equipment store, food store, chain locker, and anchor windlass), II – radar station and ammunition and electrical storage, III – living quarters and gyrocompass and artillery central room, IV – auxiliary engine room, V – main engine room with propulsion control center, VI – stern crew quarters, and VII – minesweeping equipment store, steering engine, and depth charge chutes. The lowest level of the hull housed fuel tanks, freshwater, and service water tanks, as well as the propeller shafts. On the lower level of the superstructure were the officers' cabins, mess, galley, sanitary facilities, and food storage. The upper part contained the bridge and cabins for radio, navigation, and sonar, along with a command post on the signal deck covered with a tarpaulin roof and a light three-legged mast with radio equipment antennas. The standard displacement was 426 tons, while the full displacement was 470 tons. (Note: Gardiner & Chumbley (1996, p. 316) report a standard displacement of 424 tons and a full displacement of 503 tons, while Piwowoński (1989, p. 336) states that the displacement was 450/483 tons.)

The ship was powered by two non-reversible, turbocharged 12-cylinder four-stroke diesel engines in a V configuration, the FIAT 2312SS, each with a maximum power of 1,324 kW (1,800 hp; the nominal power was 1,400 hp at 920 rpm), driving two controllable pitch propellers via Lohman GUB reduction gears. The maximum speed of the vessel was 18.4 knots (economical speed – 17 knots). The ship could carry 55.5 tons of fuel, providing a range of 2,000 nautical miles at a speed of 17 knots. (Note: Kamiński (2008a, p. 26) and Koszela (2017, p. 122) state that the range was 2,000 nautical miles at a speed of 15 knots, while Piwowoński (1989, p. 336) claims it was 3,200 nautical miles at 12 knots.) At the stern, there were two balanced rudders, each with an area of 1.7 m², operated by an MS25 steering gear. Electrical power was supplied by four British main generators, Ruston S324M, each rated at 60 kVA (consisting of a generator and a Leyland SW400 engine with a power of 72 hp at 1,500 rpm), an auxiliary generator S322M rated at 27 kVA, and an electromagnetic minesweeping generator M50. The ship's autonomy was 12 days. It could safely operate in sea state 8, while performing minesweeping tasks in sea state 4, at speeds ranging from 0 to 12 knots.

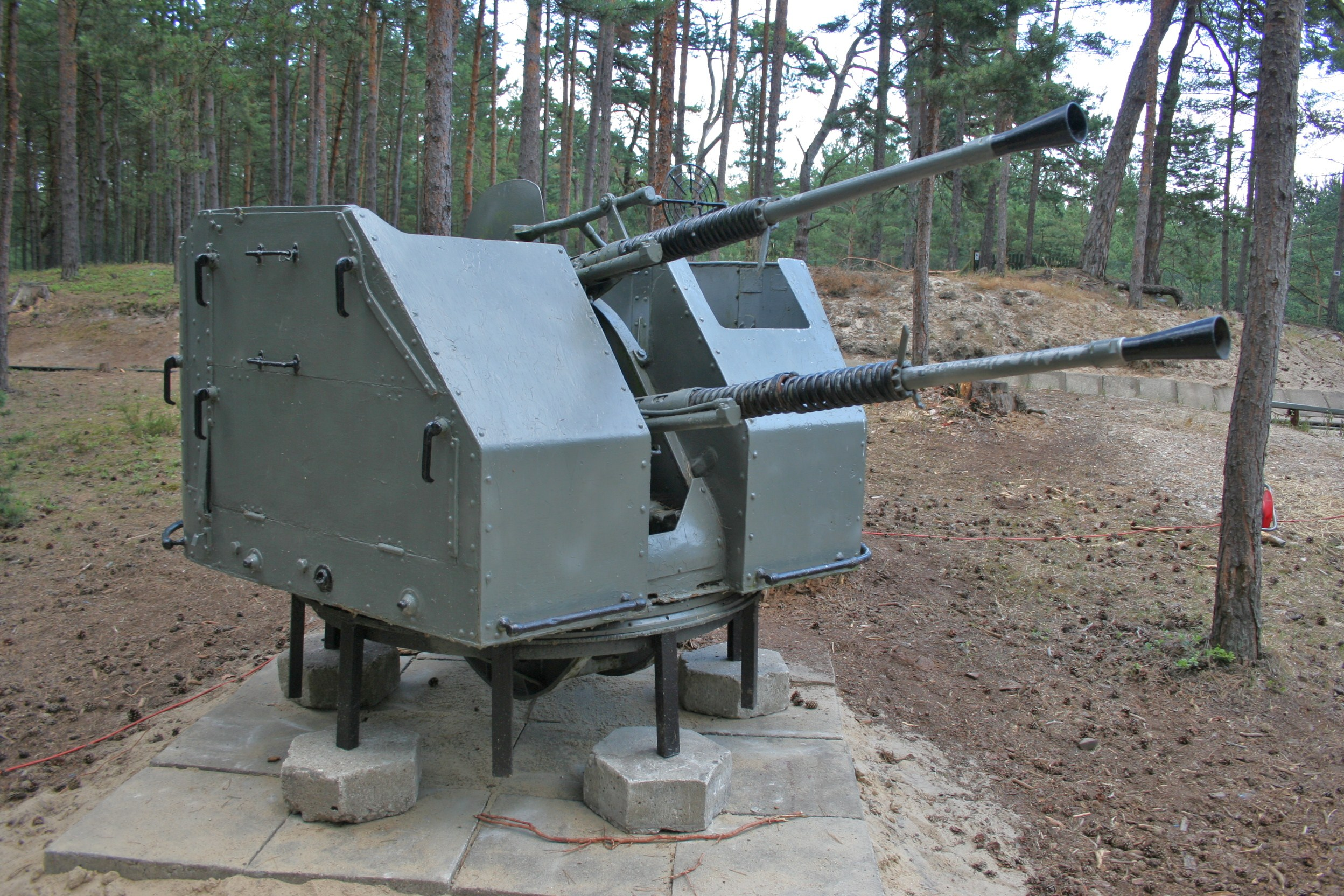
2M-3M 25 mm artillery system

The ship's initial artillery armament consisted of three twin 2M-3M 25 mm autocannons, with a total ammunition supply of 6,000 rounds. These were positioned with one mount forward of the superstructure along the ship's centerline and two mounts side by side on the aft superstructure. The anti-submarine warfare armament included two below-deck depth charge racks, with a total of 12 B-1 depth charges. Additionally, the ship was equipped with two deck-mounted mine rails, capable of alternately carrying 10 KB or AMD-500 mines, 16 08/39 mines, or 8 AMD-1000 mines. The crew was also armed with individual weapons, including 22 AK-47 rifles and 8 pistols, with a total ammunition stock of 17,000 rounds.

Minesweeping equipment included the MT-2 contact sweep, TEM-52M electromagnetic sweep, and BAT-2 acoustic sweep. The ship's electronic equipment included the Kremnij-2 identification friend or foe system, R-609 VHF radio communication station, R-644 HF transmitter, R-671 HF receiver, R-619 wideband receiver, ARP-50-1,2M direction finder, Tamir-11M (MG-11M) sonar, Lin-M general observation radar, and Rym-K radio navigation system. The ship was also equipped with 8 smoke candle racks, a Kurs-4 gyrocompass, UKPM-1M and UKPM-3M magnetic compasses, a NEŁ-5 echo sounder, MGŁ-25 chip log, and an infrared group navigation system called Chmiel.

The minesweeper was adapted for passive defense against nuclear and chemical threats. For this purpose, three rooms with filtration and ventilation devices were constructed, and dosimetric equipment, as well as decontamination spray pipelines, were installed on the ship. Degaussing equipment further supplemented the vessel's systems.

The ship's crew initially consisted of 49 personnel – 5 officers, 16 non-commissioned officers, and 28 sailors.

== Service ==
=== Service as a minesweeper (1966–1999) ===
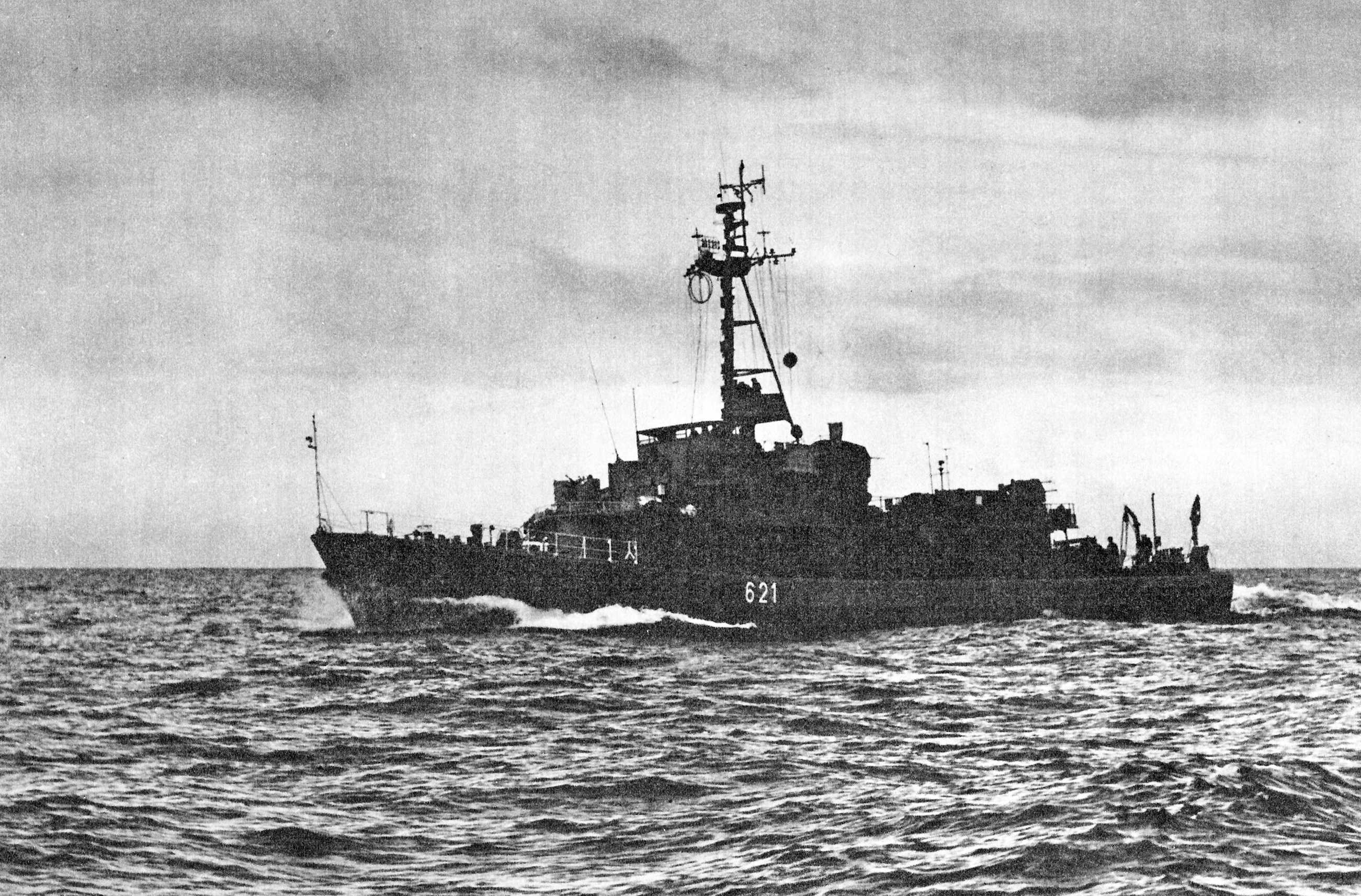
ORP Flaming in the first years of service

ORP Flaming was commissioned into the Polish Navy on 27 September 1966. With the pennant number 621, it was assigned to the 13th Minesweeper Division of the 9th Coastal Defense Flotilla, stationed in Hel, and its first commander was Lieutenant Marian Kazubek. The ship's call sign was SQWB. Its tasks included searching for and destroying minefields, conducting reconnaissance and control sweeping, marking navigation channels, and leading ships or formations behind the sweeps. The vessel, along with its sister ships, participated in almost all major Polish naval exercises and Warsaw Pact maneuvers, often assisting in neutralizing unexploded ordnance from World War II. On 10 September 1967, the French President Charles de Gaulle visited the minesweeper. In 1968, ORP Flaming made its first foreign visit, calling at Baltiysk.

In the early 1970s, ORP Flaming was part of the third group of the 13th Minesweeper Division (alongside Tukan and Pelikan). In 1970, the ship participated in the Reda 70 exercise. From 27 July to 1 August 1972, a group of Polish Navy ships (ORP Flaming, Warszawa, Głogów, Cedynia, Groźny, and the tanker Z-5), under the command of Vice Admiral Ludwik Janczyszyn, visited Leningrad. In 1972, Flaming was awarded the title of the best third-class ship in both the 9th Coastal Defense Flotilla and the Polish Navy. In 1973, the ship participated in mine clearance operations in the area designated for the construction of the Northern Port in Gdańsk. In June 1975, following the Polish Navy’s implementation of a variable numbering system, the ship's pennant number was changed to 651. That same month, the ship participated in the Posejdon-75 exercise. In mid-1976, the ship's designation was changed again, this time to 676. The vessel returned to its original pennant number (621) in mid-1978. From 4 to 26 May 1983, the minesweeper took part in the large-scale naval exercises Reda-83. In 1988, Flaming participated in the Nysa-Odra ’88 exercise.

Throughout its long service, the ship's radio-electronic equipment underwent modernization: the Lin-M radar was replaced by the newer TRN-823, the Kremnij-2 identification friend or foe system was replaced with Nichrom-RR, and a second SRN-206 radar station was added. The outdated Rym-K radionavigation system was replaced by the more modern Bras (with a Hals receiver), and British Decca navigation receivers (Pirs-1M) were installed. In the first half of the 1980s, the minesweeper’s anti-aircraft armament was strengthened with the installation of two quadruple Fasta-4M launchers for 9K32 Strela-2M anti-aircraft missiles (with a total of 16 missiles) on either side of the funnel. The minesweeping equipment was also upgraded: the MT-2 contact sweep was modernized to the MT-2W variant (with explosive cutters), and new Polish TEM-PE-2 electromagnetic and BGAT high-speed deep-water acoustic sweeps were installed. The worn-out FIAT engines were replaced with six-cylinder Sulzer 6AL25/30 diesel engines, each with a maximum output of 1,700 hp (nominally 1,100 hp at 750 rpm).

In 1994, ORP Flaming participated in the Passex exercises held in Polish waters. From 6 to 18 June 1995, the vessel (along with sister ships ORP Tukan, Czajka, and Mewa, the submarine Wilk, and the missile ships Hutnik and Metalowiec) took part in the NATO naval exercise BALTOPS '95. From 14 to 16 September 1996, ORP Flaming, along with the Belgian minehunters Lobelia and Primula, the Dutch minehunter Zierikzee, and Polish minesweepers Czajka, Mewa, and Śniardwy, participated in mine clearance operations in the sea lanes of the Gdańsk Bay. In early October 1996, the ship took part in the international Partnership for Peace exercise Cooperative Venture '96, together with ORP Lech and ORP Kaszub.

On 19 May 1998, the ship neutralized a seabed mine from World War II, discovered by a dredger in Gdynia’s outport. At the end of May, Flaming participated in the largest Polish naval exercise of the year, Rekin '98.

On 20 February 1999, the ship took part in the neutralization of unexploded ordnance found near the pier in Orłowo.

=== Conversion to a minehunter ===
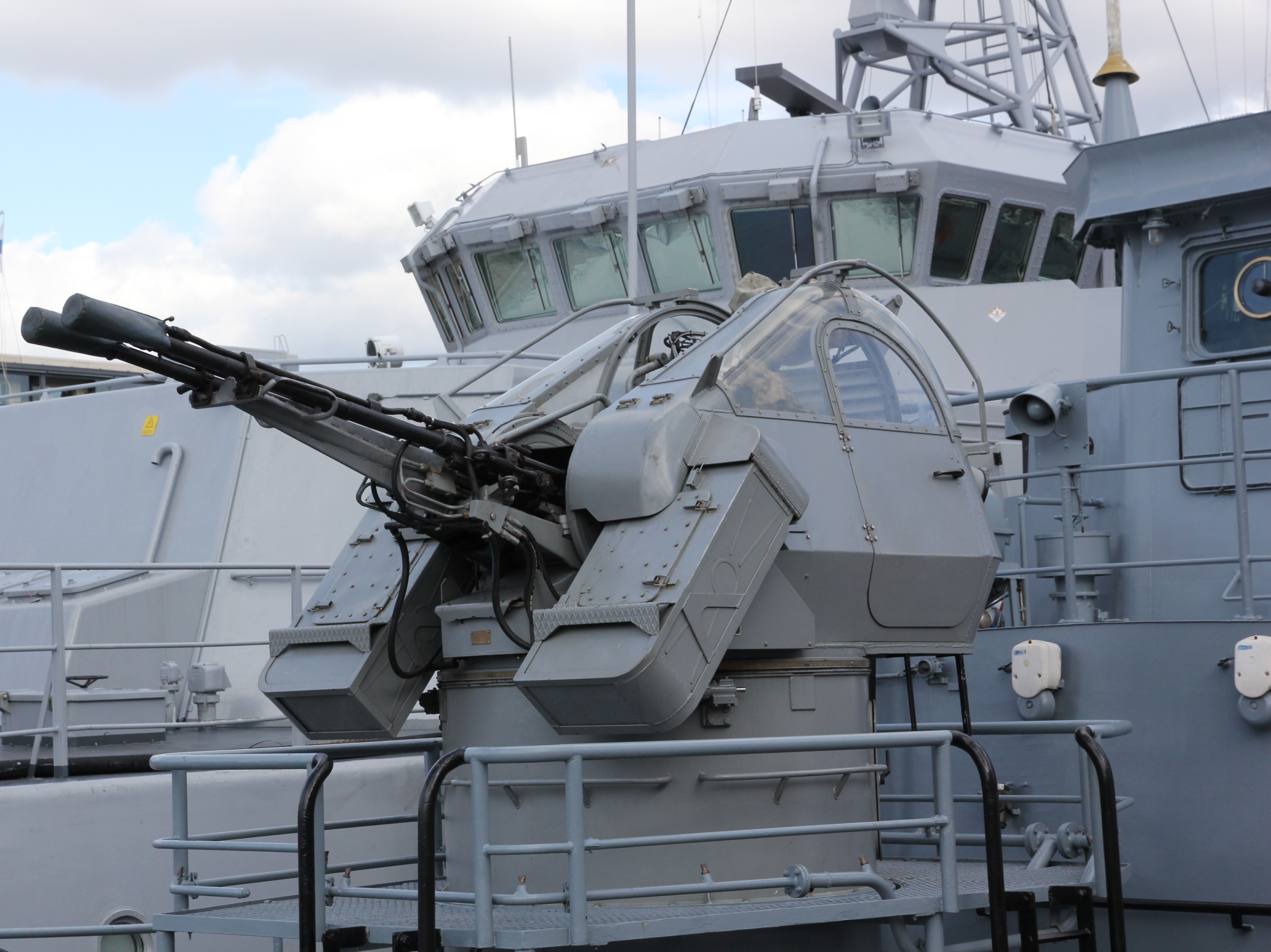
ZU-23-2MR Wróbel II cannon on Flaming

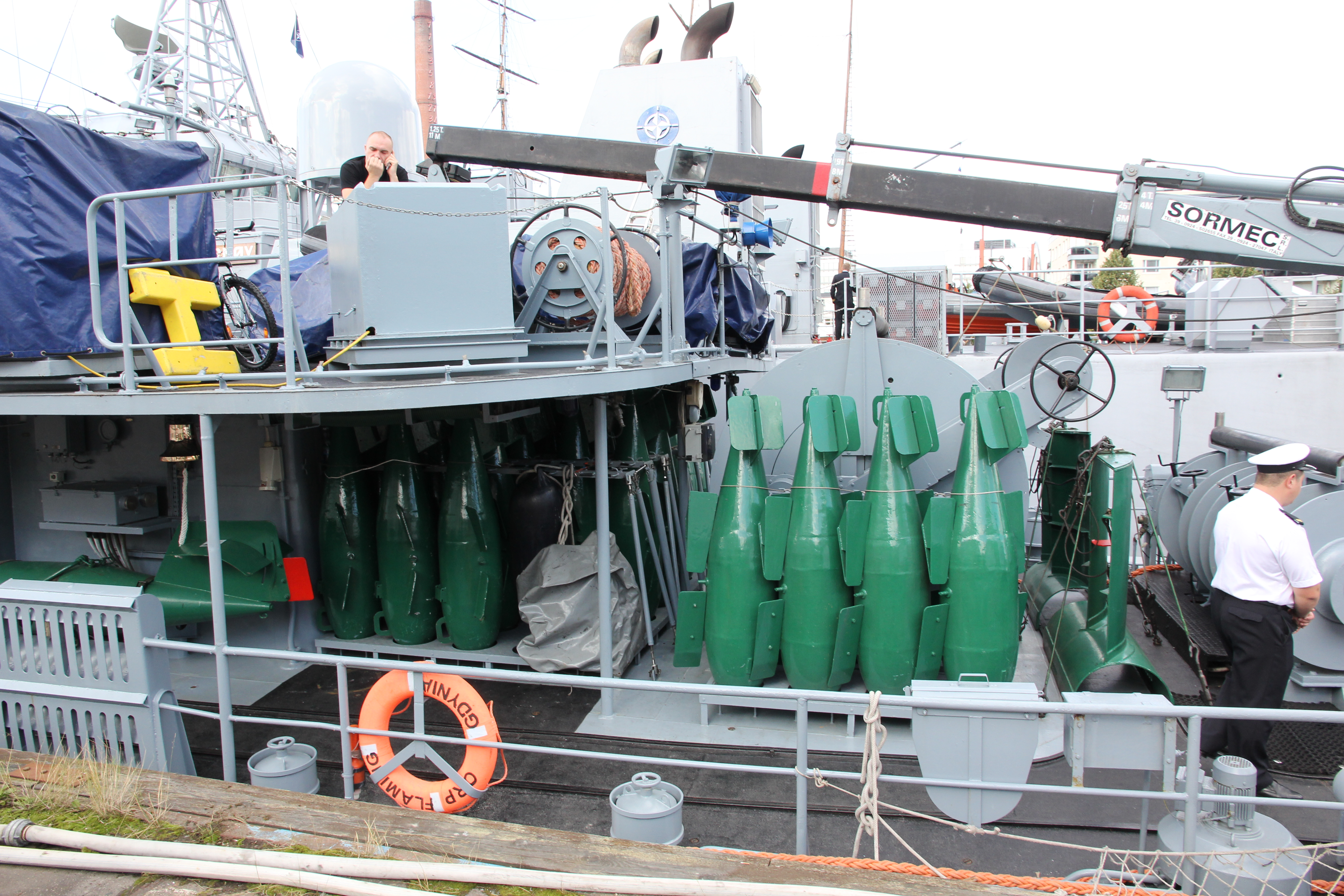
Mine sweeping equipment after the conversion (visible sweep floats)

In February 2000, ORP Flaming was decommissioned and converted into a Projekt 206FM-class minehunter, a process that lasted from March 2000 to June 2001. The modernization project was developed and executed at the Polish Navy Shipyard in Gdynia. Most of the vessel's compartments and internal structure were rebuilt, dividing the hull into 10 watertight sections. Parts of the hull plating were replaced, and the ship received an entirely new, larger superstructure, a funnel, and a tripod mast. The new superstructure housed, among other things, the main command post and a two-compartment diving chamber built by the Szczecin-based company Aquaticus, intended for the new crew members – divers.

The previous three 25 mm gun mounts were replaced by a dual-barrel 23 mm Wróbel II rocket-artillery system (ZU-23-2MR), and the ship was stripped of its depth charge throwers, although the two quadruple 9K32 Strela-2M missile launchers were retained. The ship's mine tracks were adapted to carry various mine types: 12 OS-type mines, 12 MMD-1 or MMD-2 mines, or 6 OD-type mines. The anti-mine equipment was also upgraded, now including the MT-2W contact mine (with Bofors explosive cutters), the TEM-PE-2MA electromagnetic mine, the MTA-2 acoustic mine, and two Ukwiał underwater vehicles (designed and built at Gdańsk University of Technology).

The radio-electronic equipment was upgraded as well, now consisting of the Pstrokosz and Bełtwa command support systems, Decca Bridge Master navigation radar, CRM-200 general observation radar, SHL-100MA radar station, SHL-200 Flaming B towed radar station, Jemiołuszka precision navigation system, and the Supraśl identification friend or foe system. Other installations included a FIN Skog electronic navigational chart set, HF and UHF fibre optic gyrocompasses by Rohde & Schwarz, a C.Plath fiber-optic gyrocompass, a STN Atlas Doppler log, and the MORS shipwide broadcast system. Additionally, the ship was fitted with six WNP81/9 Jastrząb decoy launchers, new ZP 125 power generators, and its engines were overhauled.

Unlike other ships converted under Projekt 206FM, Flaming was equipped with a Norwegian bow thruster by Brunvoll and a German azimuth thruster by Schottel (at the stern), both controlled by a Polish dynamic positioning system from the Szczecin-based company Autocomp. An important environmental modification was the installation of a new sewage treatment plant, recovered oil and oily water tanks, and a seawater desalination system. The new equipment increased the vessel’s full displacement to 507 tons and raised the crew size to 54. (Note: Krzewiński (2014, p. 68) states that the full displacement increased to 559 tons.) The cost of the modernization was around 40 million PLN.

=== Service as a minehunter (2001–2020) ===
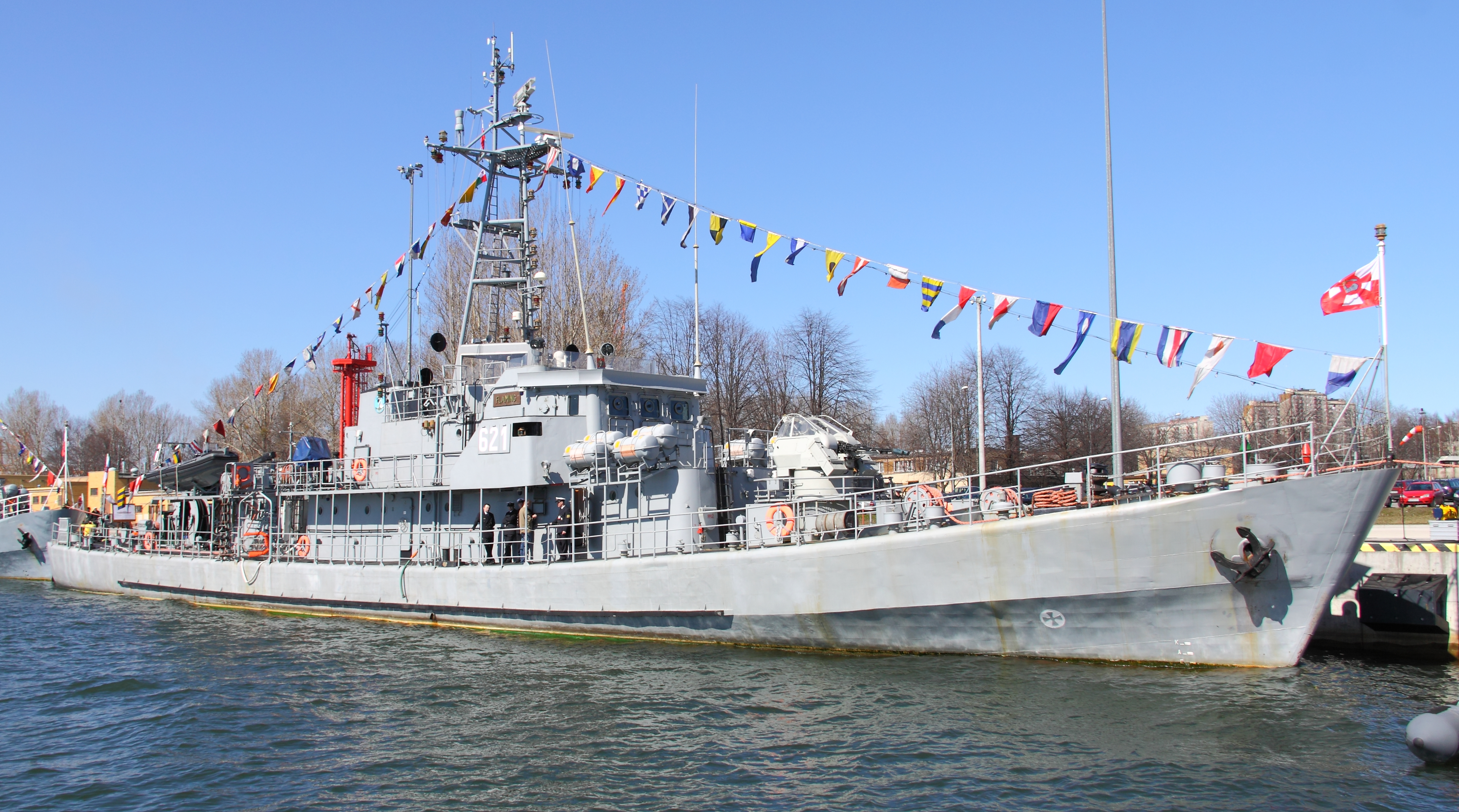
Ship after the conversion, in full dress, 2012

On 22 June 2001, the ship was recommissioned in the presence of Minister of National Defense Bronisław Komorowski. At that time, the ship’s commander was Captain Włodzimierz Kułagin. On 25 September, the ship’s crew, supported by diver-miners, neutralized two 130 mm artillery shells found on the bottom of the Gdańsk Bay. From 24 to 30 October, the ship, along with its sister ship Czajka, participated in international Passex exercises. In October and November 2001, a group of Polish Navy mine countermeasure ships (Flaming, Czajka, Mielno, Resko, Drużno, Wigry, and Śniardwy) took part in clearing dangerous elements from a sea training range between Ustka and Wicko Morskie in preparation for the NATO naval maneuvers under the codename Strong Resolve 2002 planned for the following year.

From 1 to 15 March 2002, NATO naval exercises under the codename Strong Resolve 2002 took place in Poland and Norway, involving over 100 ships. The exercises on the Norwegian Sea, the North Sea, and the Baltic Sea included 14 Polish units, including ORP Flaming. From 22 April to 10 May, Flaming, under the command of Captain Włodzimierz Kułagin, participated alongside Czajka in the Blue Game 2002 exercises in the Danish Straits. From 26 to 28 June, the ship, along with the Dutch minesweeper Willemstad, participated in Polish-Dutch mine countermeasure exercises in the Gdańsk Bay. From 25 to 30 November, Flaming, Mewa, and Czajka took part in international Passex exercises in Polish waters.

In January 2003, ORP Flaming was assigned to the NATO Mine Countermeasures Force North (MCMForNorth). On 2 April, the ship participated in the neutralization of an aerial bottom mine located near the entrance to the port of Gdynia. From 15 to 17 April, the vessel participated in international mine countermeasure exercises MCM SQNEX in the southern Baltic Sea (with the Polish fleet also represented by ORP Gopło and Wdzydze). From 8 to 28 May, Flaming was in Zeebrugge, undergoing operational training at the Mine Countermeasures Vessels Operational Training center to confirm its readiness for NATO task forces. On July 24, the crew neutralized three German 203 mm shells found near the entrance to the port of Gdańsk. From August 16 to September 5, Flaming participated in MCMForNorth operations on the Atlantic, the North Sea, and the Danish Straits, returning to Poland on October 6.

From 20 to 21 April 2004, the ship carried out an operation to remove World War II mines and torpedoes resting on the seabed of the Bay of Puck, south of Jurata and Kuźnica. From May 24 to June 2, ORP Flaming took part in a NATO operation under the codename MC OPEST – the removal of dangerous World War II remnants from the Gulf of Finland off the coast of Estonia. From 4 to 24 September, ORP Flaming and Czajka participated in the mine countermeasure operation Open Spirit 2004 off the coast of Lithuania.

From 9 to 19 May 2005, ORP Flaming participated in the MCM SQNEX mine countermeasure exercises, conducted in the Baltic with the participation of 14 ships from seven NATO countries (the Polish Navy was also represented by ORP Czajka, Gopło, and Śniardwy). On August 2/3, the ship, together with a team of diver-miners from the 9th Coastal Defense Flotilla, neutralized a 533 mm exercise torpedo from World War II off the coast of Redłowo. Between 2 and 12 September, Flaming took part in international mine countermeasure exercises Open Spirit 2005 off the coast of Latvia, during which 19 ships from 13 countries were involved in destroying mines, torpedoes, and other dangerous remnants from World War II. From 11 to 18 November, as part of the Standing NATO Response Force Mine-countermeasures Group 1 (SNMCMG1), the ship participated in international Passex exercises in the southern Baltic Sea.

At the turn of 2005 and 2006, the Jastrząb decoy launchers were removed from the ship. From late March to 7 April 2006, ORP Flaming, Gen. K. Pułaski, and Kondor took part in the largest NATO maneuvers organized in Northern Europe, under the codename Brilliant Mariner 2006, involving 80 ships from 20 countries. On August 7, the ship (under the command of Commander Cezary Gnoza) began a three-month mission in SNMCMG1, which ended on October 27. In June 2006, following the disbandment of the 9th Coastal Defense Flotilla, Flaming, along with the entire 13th Minesweeper Squadron, was transferred to Gdynia, becoming part of the 8th Coastal Defense Flotilla. From 4 to 12 September, the vessel, along with its sister ship Czajka, took part in the Open Spirit 2006 international exercises in the waters of the Gulf of Finland. In September and October, Flaming participated in SNMCMG1 exercises under the codenames Passex and Amber Sea. On December 15, in the naval port of Gdynia, the ship celebrated its 40th anniversary of service in the Polish Navy. In 2007, an automatic identification system (AIS) was installed on the vessel. On 6 November 2007, ORP Flaming, Mewa, Gopło, and Mamry participated in international mine countermeasure exercises MCM SQNEX in the Baltic Sea, which also included Latvian ships Virsaitis and Viesturs and the Lithuanian ship Kuršis.

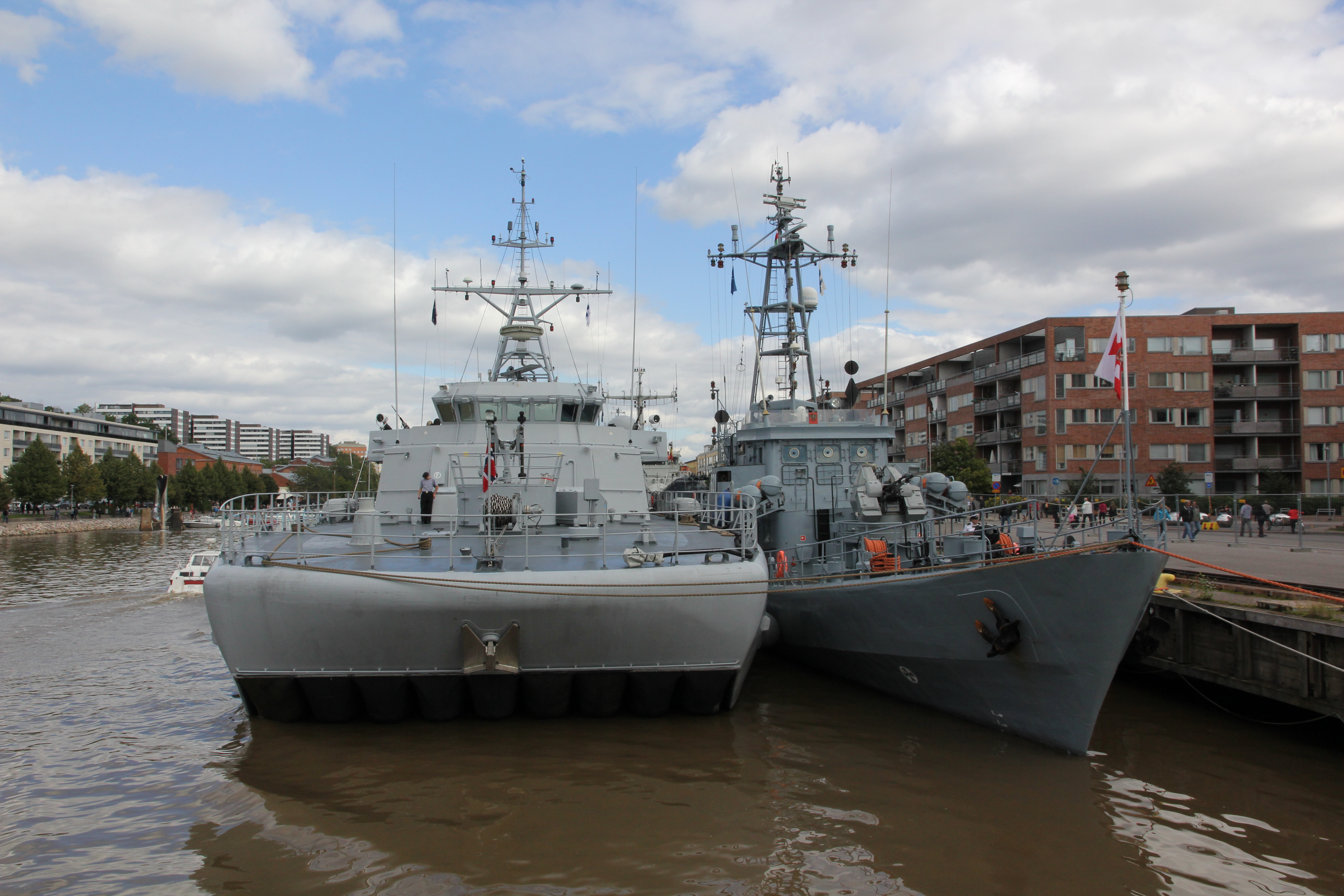
Flaming during a visit to Turku, August 2014, with the Norwegian minesweeper Karmøy

In 2008, the vessel underwent a repeat examination at the Mine Countermeasures Vessels Operational Training facility in Zeebrugge to reaffirm its readiness for NATO missions. From 19 to 23 May 2008, ORP Flaming, Czajka, and Gopło participated in the Passex exercises in the Gulf of Gdańsk. On 29 January 2009, the crew neutralized a torpedo near the shipping lane to the port of Gdańsk, and on February 19, it destroyed depth bombs on the wreck of the German submarine chaser UJ-301. From 11 to 14 May 2009, Flaming took part in Operation MCOPLAT ’09, focusing on destroying unexploded ordnance in the Gulf of Riga, where it neutralized two bottom mines weighing 115 kg and 230 kg. From 31 August to 11 September, ORP Flaming (commanded by Lieutenant Commander Jarosław Tuszkowski) and Mewa took part in the Open Spirit 2009 mine countermeasures operation in the Gulf of Riga, destroying a total of 10 mines weighing around 3 tons, including an 880 kg mine neutralized by Flaming.

From August 26 to 9 September 2010, Flaming and Mewa participated in the Open Spirit 2010 operation off the coast of Lithuania, neutralizing one mine and one torpedo. On 15, 16, and 22 September, ORP Flaming recovered three German practice torpedoes from the bottom of the Gulf of Gdańsk, discovered during hydrographic surveys. On September 27, the 13th Minesweeper Squadron was placed under the command of the 3rd Ship Flotilla.

Between August 31 and 27 November 2011, Flaming joined the SNMCMG1 group for the third time. On September 3, the ship, with the assistance of divers, retrieved a sea mine and an aircraft bomb casing from the bottom of the Świnoujście waters. From 5 to 6 September, Flaming, as part of SNMCMG1, took part in the Passex exercises in the Bay of Pomerania, alongside ORP Nakło and Drużno. From September to November, the vessel participated in NATO exercises DANEX and NORTHERN COASTS in the Baltic Sea.

From 15 to 31 August 2013, ORP Flaming took part in the Open Spirit 2013 operation off the coast of Lithuania. On 1 and 2 October 2013, the crew neutralized two German torpedoes resting on the seabed near the port of Gdynia. Between May 5 and 12 December 2014, Flaming again joined the SNMCMG1 group, participating in the NATO naval exercises BALTOPS 2014 in the Baltic Sea, alongside ORP Gopło, Sarbsko, Wicko, and Sęp. From 1 to 12 September 2014, ORP Flaming, Mewa, Hańcza, Nakło, and Drużno took part in the NORTHERN COASTS exercises in the northern Baltic. In October 2014, off the coast of Scotland, Flaming, as part of SNMCMG1, participated in the JOINT WARRIOR 14-2 exercises. At the beginning of 2015, the vessel, together with divers, neutralized World War II torpedoes in the Gulf of Gdańsk, and in March, destroyed five sea mines near the port of Gdynia.

From 23 to 25 January 2016, Flaming, together with divers and the minesweepers ORP Gopło and Wdzydze, conducted an operation to neutralize a German bottom mine in the port canal near the Wisłoujście Fortress. Between 31 August and 16 September 2016, Flaming, Resko, Dąbie, Jamno, and Kaszub took part in the NORTHERN COASTS exercises in the western Baltic and the Danish Straits. On 11 October 2016, ORP Flaming celebrated its 50th anniversary of service in the Polish Navy.

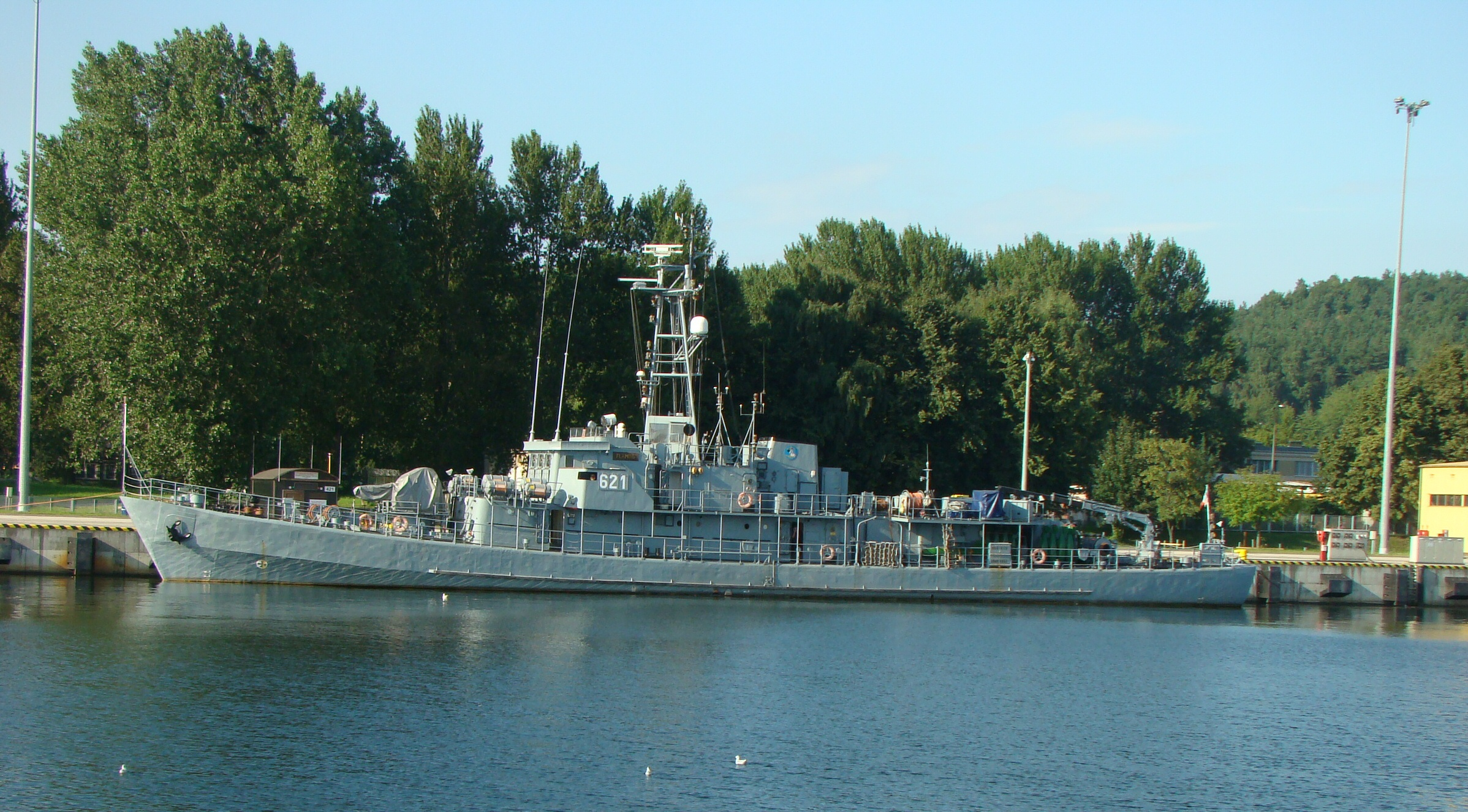
ORP Flaming in Gdynia, 2017

In September 2017, off the coasts of Sweden and Denmark, ORP Flaming, Gen. K. Pułaski, Kaszub, Dąbie, Jamno, and Mielno participated in the NORTHERN COASTS exercises. From 11 to 24 May 2018, ORP Flaming, under the temporary command of Captain Piotr Gorycki (commander of its sister ship Czajka), took part in the mine countermeasure operation Open Spirit 2018 off the coast of Estonia. On 24 June 2018, the ship participated in a naval parade in Gdynia, organized to commemorate the 100th anniversary of the Polish Navy.

In July 2019, the ship, with the assistance of divers, conducted an operation to neutralize a British Mk IV sea mine, which was lying at the entrance to the Piast Canal in the Szczecin Lagoon. From 3 to 17 September 2019, in the western part of the Baltic Sea, the NORTHERN COASTS exercises took place, involving ORP Flaming, Gardno, Jamno, and Bałtyk.

On 16 June 2020, near the port of Gdynia, the minesweepers ORP Flaming and Kormoran, with the assistance of divers, neutralized a German GC-type sea mine.

On 4 December 2020, after more than 54 years of service in the Polish Navy, the ship's flag was lowered for the last time at the Naval Port in Gdynia.

== Commanders of the ship ==
Sources:

- 5 May 1966 – 30 November 1968 – Captain Marian Kazubek
- 1 December 1968 – 15 February 1971 – Lieutenant Michał Cieluch
- 16 February 1971 – 14 November 1971 – Lieutenant Stefan Gierczak
- 15 November 1971 – 27 December 1974 – Lieutenant Jan Wawrzyniak
- 28 December 1974 – 26 April 1977 – Lieutenant Wacław Drobniewski
- 27 April 1977 – 8 March 1979 – Lieutenant Michał Świerkosz
- 4 April 1980 – 21 August 1982 – Lieutenant Bogusław Bąk
- 22 August 1982 – 08 December 1988 – Lieutenant Jan Dojerski
- 9 December 1988 – 18 December 1991 – Lieutenant Jarosław Stolczyk
- 18 December 1991 – 03 July 1992 – Lieutenant Tomasz Chęciński
- 3 July 1992 – 16 August 1995 – Lieutenant Andrzej Kochalski
- 16 August 1995 – 27 October 1998 – Lieutenant Arkadiusz Walczak
- 27 October 1998 – 20 April 2001 – Captain Piotr Mieczkowski
- 20 April 2001 – 26 August 2002 – Captain Włodzimierz Kułagin
- 26 August 2002 – 31 August 2003 – Captain Andrzej Danilewicz
- 31 August 2003 – 1 January 2006 – Captain Krzysztof Rybak
- 1 August 2006 – 1 August 2009 – Commander Cezary Gnoza
- 1 August 2009 – 30 June 2015 – Commander Jarosław Tuszkowski
- 1 July 2015 – 22 November 2019 – Commander Piotr Pasztelan
- ? – ? – Captain Bartosz Fijałkowski
- ? – 4 December 2020 – Commander Michał Narłowski

== Bibliography ==
- Ciślak, Jarosław (2001). "ORP Flaming po modernizacji" [ORP Flaming After Modernization]. Nowa Technika Wojskowa (in Polish). 8. Magnum-X. ISSN 1230-1655.
- Ciślak, Jarosław (1995). Polska Marynarka Wojenna 1995: okręty, samoloty i śmigłowce, uzbrojenie, organizacja [Polish Navy 1995: ships, airplanes and helicopters, armament, organization] (in Polish) (I ed.). Warsaw: Lampart & Bellona. ISBN 83-86776-08-0.
- Ciślak, Jarosław; Walczak, Janusz (2003). "Kronika Polskiej Marynarki Wojennej" [Chronicle of the Polish Navy]. Morza, Statki i Okręty (in Polish). 3 (40). Magnum-X. ISSN 1426-529X.
- Gardiner, Robert; Chumbley, Stephen, eds. (1996). Conway's All The World's Fighting Ships 1947-1995. Annapolis: Naval Institute Press. ISBN 1-55750-132-7.
- Kamiński, Jerzy M. (2008). "Współczesne "ptaszki" czyli historia projektu 206" [Modern "Birdies" or the history of Project 206]. Morze, Statki i Okręty (in Polish). 9 (81). Magnum-X. ISSN 1426-529X.
- Kamiński, Jerzy M. (2008). "Na drodze do pierwszego polskiego niszczyciela min. Okręty projektu 206FM" [On the road to the first Polish minesweeper: Project 206FM ships]. Morze, Statki i Okręty (in Polish). 11 (83). Magnum-X. ISSN 1426-529X.
- Koszela, Witold (2017). Okręty Floty Polskiej [Ships of the Polish Fleet] (in Polish). Vol. II. Oświęcim: Napoleon V. ISBN 978-83-65746-68-9.
- Krzewiński, Jacek (2014). "Niszczyciele min projektu 206FM" [Project 206FM minesweepers]. Okręty (in Polish). 1 (31). KAGERO. ISSN 1898-1518.
- Nitka, Andrzej (2001). "Druga młodość Flaminga" [The Second Youth of Flaming]. Okręty Wojenne (in Polish). 3 (48). Tarnowskie Góry: Wydawnictwo Okręty Wojenne. ISSN 1231-014X.
- Pater, Walter (1994). "Polskie trałowce typu Orlik (proj. "206F")" [Polish Orlik-class trawlers (proj. "206F")]. Okręty Wojenne (in Polish). 11. Tarnowskie Góry. ISSN 1231-014X.
- Pietlewannyj, M. B. (2009). Korabli stran Warszawskogo dogowora Корабли стран Варшавского договора [Ships of the Warsaw Pact countries] (in Russian). Saint Petersburg: Galeja Print. ISBN 978-5-8172-0127-7.
- Piwowoński, Jan (1989). Flota spod biało-czerwonej [The fleet under the white and red] (in Polish). Warsaw: Nasza Księgarnia. ISBN 83-10-08902-3.
- Rochowicz, Robert (2020). "Narcyz – system zmiennych numerów burtowych" [Narcyz – system of variable hull numbers]. Morze, Statki i Okręty (in Polish). 11–12 (201). Magnum-X. ISSN 1426-529X.
- Serafin, Mieczysław (2008). Polska Marynarka Wojenna 1945-2007. Kronika wydarzeń [Polish Navy 1945–2007: A Chronicle of Events] (in Polish). Gdynia: Zespół Redakcyjno-Wydawniczy Marynarki Wojennej. ISBN 978-83-88698-03-3.
- Sołkiewicz, Henryk, ed. (2015). Ewolucyjny rozwój sił okrętowych Marynarki Wojennej w latach 1945–2010 [The Evolutionary Development of the Naval Forces of the Polish Navy in 1945–2010] (in Polish). Gdynia: Wydawnictwo BP/Akademia Marynarki Wojennej. ISBN 978-83-941308-4-8.
