= Orlik-class minesweeper =

Series of Polish minesweepers

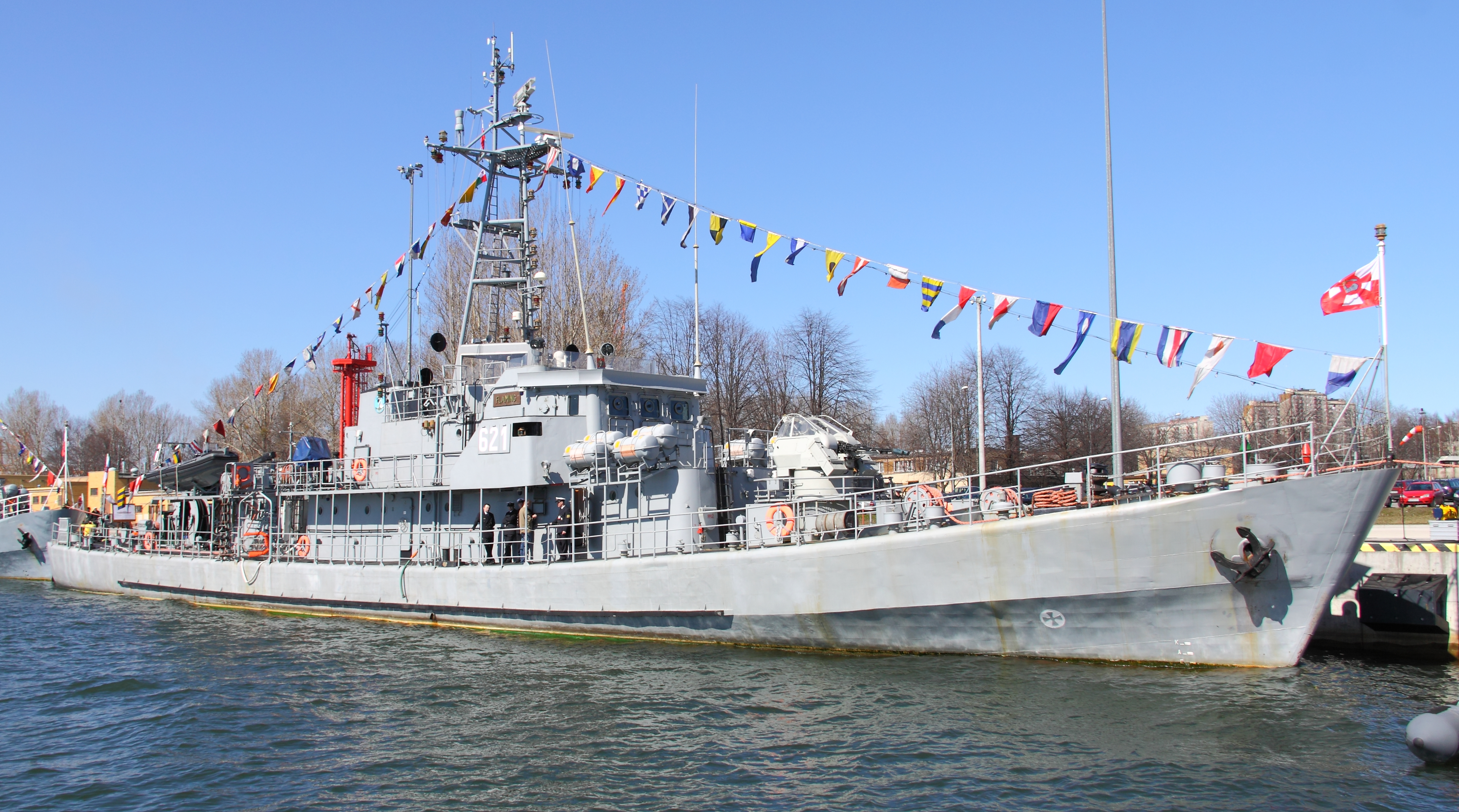
- ORP Flaming after conversion to a minehunter

Class overview
- Builders: Stocznia Gdynia
- Operators: Polish Navy
- Preceded by: Project 254
- Succeeded by: Project 207 (Gardno)
- Subclasses: Project 206FM
- Completed: 12
- Active: 0

General characteristics
- Displacement: standard: 426 t (419 long tons); full: 470 t (460 long tons)
- Length: 58.2 m (190 ft 11 in)
- Beam: 7.97 m (26 ft 2 in)
- Draft: 2.14 m (7 ft 0 in)
- Propulsion: 2 Fiat 2312 SS diesel engines with a total power of 2,648 kW (3,551 hp); 2 propellers
- Speed: 18.4 knots (34.1 km/h; 21.2 mph)
- Range: 2,000 nmi (3,700 km; 2,300 mi) at a speed of 17 kn (31 km/h; 20 mph)
- Complement: 49
- Armament: 3 × twin 25 mm 2M-3M autocannons; 2 depth charges, from 10 to 16 naval mines

The Orlik-class minesweepers, also known as Project 206F or Krogulec class in NATO code, were a series of 12 Polish base minesweepers constructed in the 1960s. These vessels measured 58.2 metres (190 ft 11 in) in length, 7.97 metres (26 ft 2 in) in beam, and had a draft of 2.14 metres (7 ft 0 in), with a full displacement of 470 tonnes (460 long tons). They were armed with three twin autocannons 2M-3M of 25-millimetre (0.98 in) calibre, depth charges, and were equipped to carry and deploy naval mines.

All ships were built at Stocznia Gdynia in Gdynia between 1961 and 1966 and were commissioned into the Polish Navy from 1963 to 1967. These heavily utilized vessels served their entire careers in the 13th Minesweeper Squadron of the 9th Coast Defence Flotilla based at Hel. Between 1998 and 2000, three ships were converted into Projekt 206FM-class minehunters. The remaining units were decommissioned between 1989 and 2002 after decades of service.

== Design and construction ==
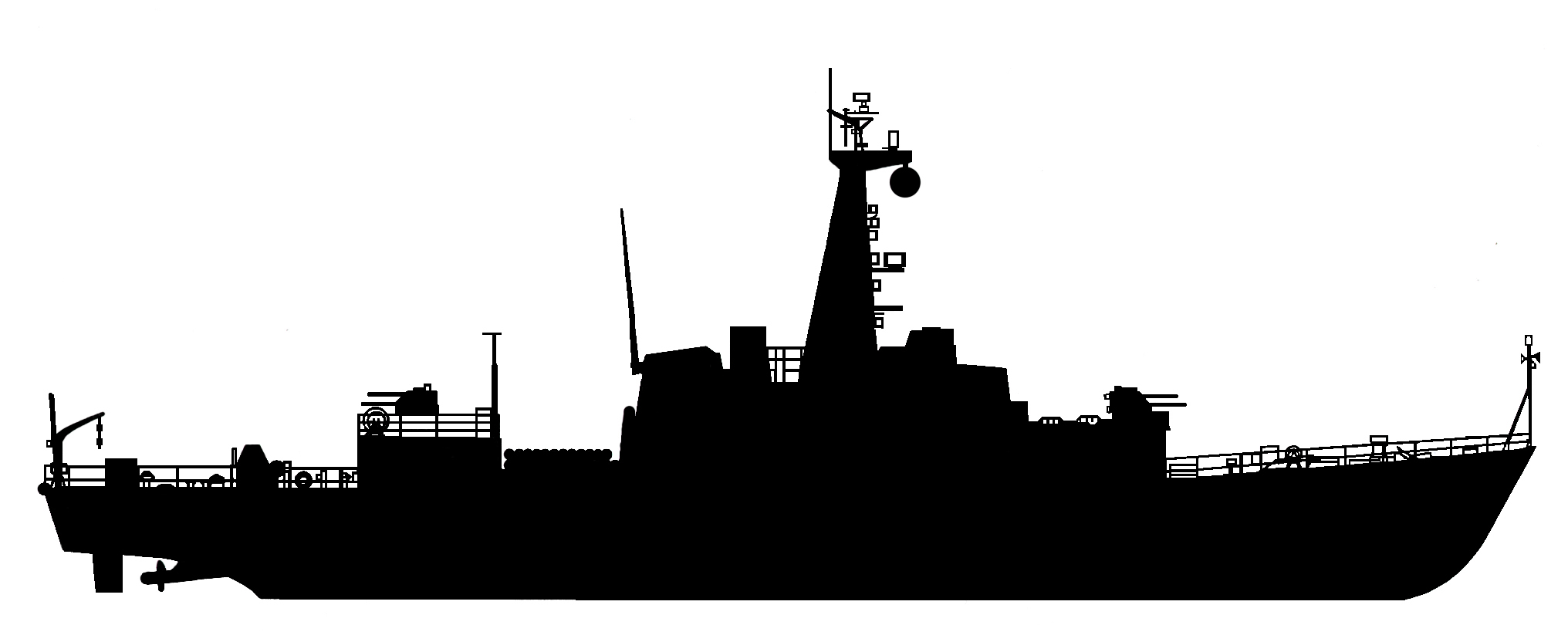
Silhouette of a Project 206F minesweeper

Design work for a new minesweeper type began in 1958 at the Central Ship Design Bureau No. 2 in Gdańsk, aiming to replace the Project 253Ł-class minesweepers in service since 1946. Initially, the new ships were intended as inshore minesweepers capable of contact and non-contact sweeping near naval bases and deploying small minefields. They were designed with a displacement of approximately 200 tonnes (200 long tons), a speed of 18 knots (33 km/h; 21 mph), a range of 3,000 nautical miles (5,600 km; 3,500 mi), and armament consisting of two 45-millimetre (1.8 in) guns and four 14.5 mm (0.57 in) heavy machine guns, along with standard minesweeping equipment of the late 1950s. Concurrently, the Polish Navy Command issued requirements for a larger base minesweeper with a displacement of 570 t (560 long tons), despite preparations for the licensed production of Soviet T43-class minesweepers. Under the leadership of engineer Henryk Andrzejewski, the design bureau developed both the inshore minesweeper (designated Project 206) and four larger base minesweeper designs (Projects 250–253). After extensive discussions, work on Projects 250–253 was halted, and Project 206 was adapted into a base minesweeper. In 1959, the bureau finalized a modified design with a displacement of 425 t (418 long tons), powered by Italian Fiat diesel engines, as suitable engines were unavailable in Eastern Bloc countries. The design, designated B206F, was approved for construction in December 1959 by the Minister of National Defence, with the final technical design approved by the Navy Command on 19 February 1962. The documentation cost 1.7 million PLN, the prototype (later ORP Orlik) cost 80 million PLN, and serial units cost 65.5 million PLN each. The annual operational limit was set at 700 hours, with a design lifespan of 20 years.

All Project 206F ships were constructed at Stocznia Gdynia in Gdynia (yard numbers 206F/1 to 206F/12). Military supervision was provided by Lieutenant Commander Engineer Konstanty Cudny. The shipyard employed a sectional hull construction method, developed previously for mass production of fishing trawlers, with sections joined on the slipway. The keels were laid between 1961 and 1966, and the ships were launched from 1962 to 1966. The minesweepers were named after birds, following the tradition for Polish mine warfare ships.

== Technical specifications ==
The ships were flush-decked, oceangoing minesweepers designed for operations in partially iced conditions. They had an overall length of 58.2 metres (190 ft 11 in), a beam of 7.97 m (26 ft 2 in), and a draft of 2.14 m (7 ft 0 in). The freeboard was 4 m (13 ft). Their hull, constructed from fully welded steel, was reinforced to withstand underwater explosions. The hull was divided into seven watertight compartments: from the bow, these were: I – forepeak (bosun's store, equipment, provisions, chain locker, and anchor windlass), II – radar station, artillery, and electrical storage, III – crew quarters, gyrocompass room, and artillery control, IV – auxiliary machinery, V – main machinery with propulsion control, VI – stern crew quarters, and VII – minesweeping equipment storage, rudder machinery, and depth charge racks. The lower hull housed fuel tanks, fresh and utility water tanks, and propeller shafts. The lower superstructure level contained officers' cabins, a wardroom, kitchen, sanitary facilities, and small provisions stores. The upper level included the bridge, radio, navigation, and sonar cabins, and, on the signal deck, a canvas-covered command post and a lightweight tripod mast with radio antennas. The standard displacement was 426 t (419 long tons), and full displacement was 470 t.

The ships were powered by two non-reversible, turbocharged, 12-cylinder, four-stroke diesel engines in a V configuration, Fiat 2312 SS, each producing 1,324 kilowatts (1,776 hp) at maximum (nominal 1,400 hp at 920 rpm), driving two controllable-pitch propellers Lips-Schelde via Lohman GUB reduction gears. The maximum speed was 18.4 knots (economical speed 17 knots). The ships carried 55.5 t (54.6 long tons; 61.2 short tons) of marine fuel, providing a range of 2,000 nautical miles (3,700 km; 2,300 mi) at 17 knots (31 km/h; 20 mph). Two balanced rudders at the stern were operated by an MS25 steering engine. Electrical power was supplied by four British generators Ruston & Hornsby S324M, each rated at 60 kVA (comprising a generator and a Leyland SW400 engine of 72 hp at 1,500 rpm), a standby generator S322M of 27 kVA, and an electromagnetic minesweeping generator M50. The ships' endurance was 12 days. They could operate safely in sea state 8 and perform minesweeping tasks up to sea state 4 at speeds from 0 to 12 knots (22 km/h; 14 mph).

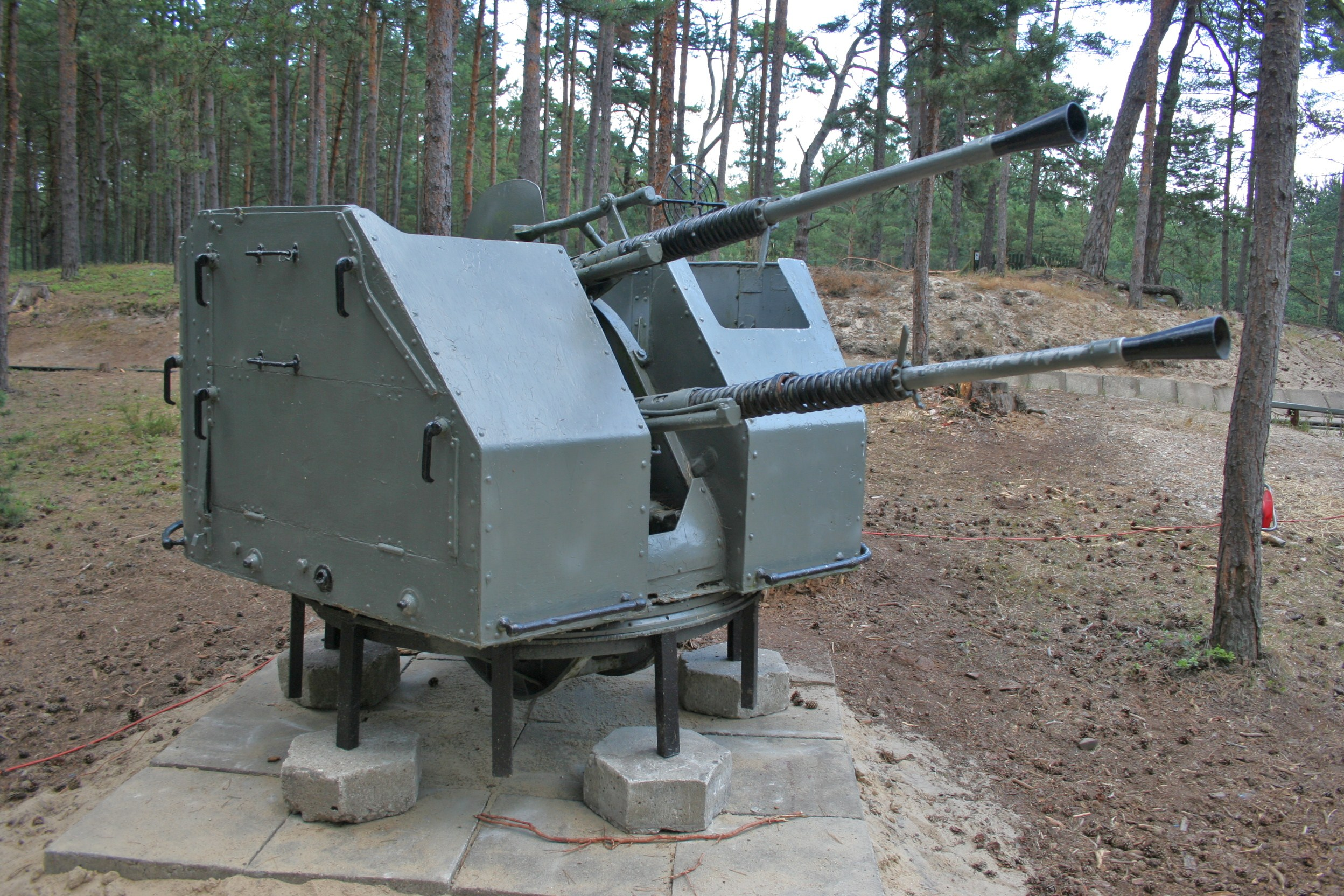
25 mm 2M-3M gun mount

The artillery armament consisted of three twin autocannons 2M-3M of 25 mm calibre, with a total ammunition stock of 6,000 rounds, positioned one forward of the superstructure and two side-by-side on the aft superstructure. Anti-submarine weapons included two below-deck depth charge racks with 12 B-1 depth charges. The ships had two deck-mounted mine rails, capable of carrying either 10 KB or AMD-500 mines, 16 wz. 08/39 mines, or 8 AMD-1000 mines. The crew was equipped with small arms, including 22 AK rifles and 8 pistols, with a total of 17,000 rounds of ammunition.

Initial minesweeping equipment included the MT-2 contact sweep, TEM-52M electromagnetic sweep, and BAT-2 acoustic sweep. Electronic equipment comprised the Kremnij-2 IFF system, VHF radio R-609M, HF transmitter R-644, HF receiver R-671, full-range receiver R-619, radio direction finder ARP-50-1.2M, sonar Tamir-11M (MG-11M), general observation radar Lin-M, and Rym-K radionavigation system. The ships also carried 8 MDSz smoke generators, a Kurs-4 gyrocompass, UKPM-1M and UKPM-3M compasses, NEŁ-5 echo sounder, MGŁ-25 chip log, and the Chmiel infrared team navigation system.

The minesweepers were equipped for passive nuclear and chemical defense, featuring three compartments with air filtration systems, dosimetric devices, and pipelines for washing down the ship. They also had degaussing equipment.

The crew consisted of 49 personnel: 5 officers, 16 non-commissioned officers, and 28 sailors.

== Service history ==
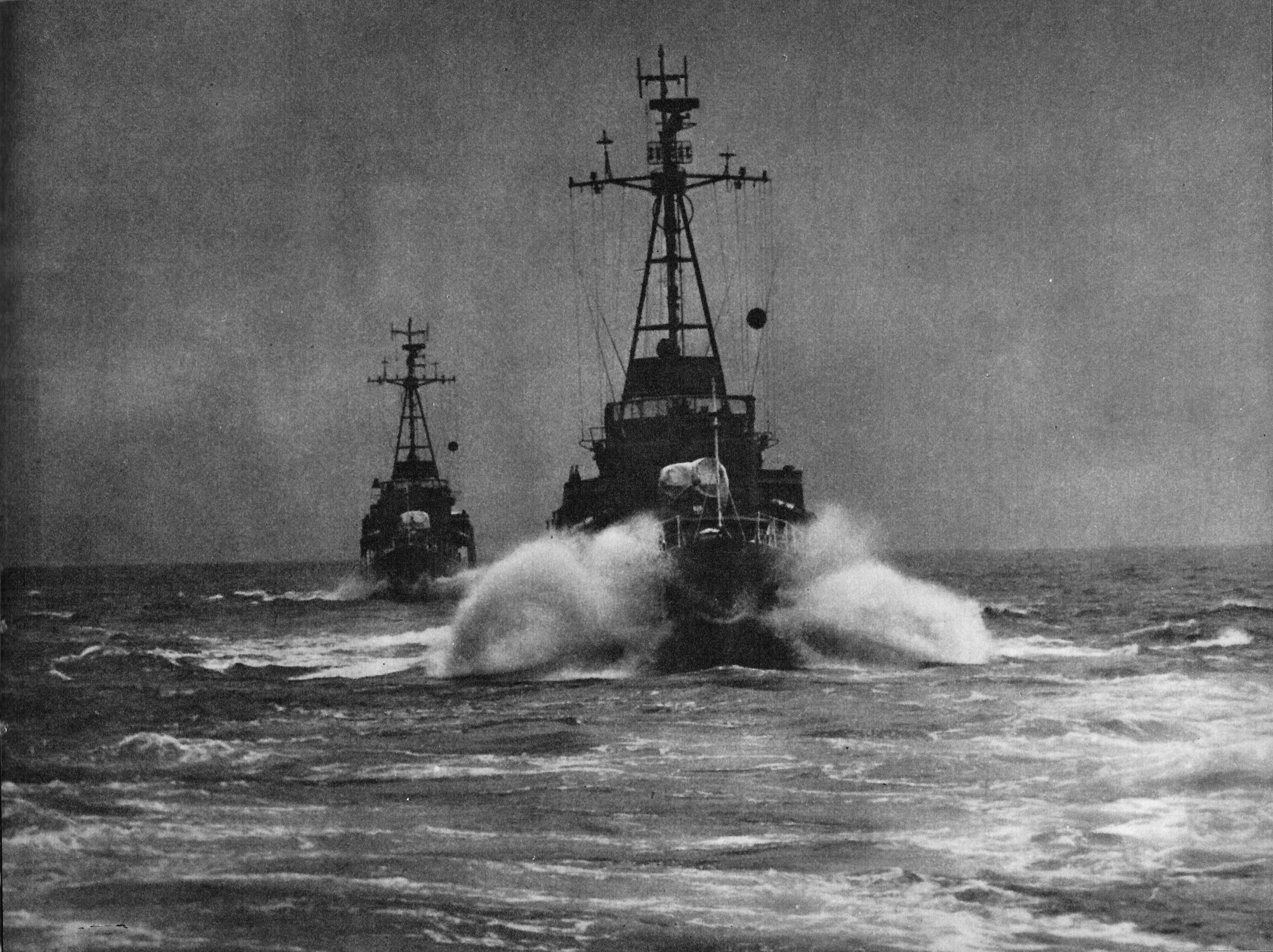
Polish Project 206F minesweepers at sea

The first Project 206F minesweeper, ORP Orlik, was commissioned into the Polish Navy on 24 August 1963, in the presence of the Chief of the General Staff, General Jerzy Bordziłowski, and Navy Commander Vice Admiral Zdzisław Studziński. The remaining 11 ships were commissioned in subsequent years, with ORP Czajka entering service last on 23 June 1967. The ships, bearing hull numbers 613–624, joined the 13th Minesweeper Squadron of the 9th Coast Defence Flotilla based at Hel. Their tasks included locating and neutralizing minefields, conducting reconnaissance and control sweeping, charting navigation routes, and escorting ships or fleets through swept channels. They participated in nearly all major Polish naval exercises and Warsaw Pact fleet manoeuvres, frequently neutralizing unexploded ordnance from World War II.

In the early 1970s, the Orlik-class minesweepers were organized into four three-ship groups within the 13th Minesweeper Squadron. From 1970 to 1974, they conducted minesweeping operations in the area designated for the construction of the North Port in Gdańsk. In June 1975, the Navy introduced a variable numbering system, changing the ships' hull numbers to 643–654. In mid-1976, the numbers were changed again to 668–679, before reverting to the original 613–624 in mid-1978.

During their long service, the ships' electronic equipment was upgraded: the Lin-M radar was replaced with the TRN-823, the Kremnij-2 IFF system with the Nichrom-RR, and a second radar, SRN-206 or SRN-2061, was added. The outdated Rym-K radionavigation system was replaced with the Bras system (with a Hals receiver), and British Decca Pirs-1M receivers were installed. In the early 1980s, anti-aircraft armament was enhanced with two quadruple Fasta-4M launchers for Strela-2M missiles (with 16 missiles total) installed near the funnel on both sides. Minesweeping equipment was also upgraded: the MT-2 contact sweep was modernized to the MT-2W variant with explosive cutters, and new Polish TEM-PE-2 electromagnetic and BGAT deep-water, high-speed acoustic sweeps were installed. On several ships, including ORP Krogulec, ORP Pelikan, ORP Flaming, and ORP Rybitwa, worn-out Fiat engines were replaced with six-cylinder Sulzer 6AL25/30 diesel engines, each producing 1,700 hp (nominal 1,100 hp at 750 rpm).

By the late 1980s and early 1990s, the aging minesweepers began to be decommissioned: ORP Orlik and ORP Krogulec in 1989, ORP Jastrząb and ORP Czapla in 1990, ORP Kormoran and ORP Pelikan in 1993, and ORP Albatros in 1994.

=== Conversion of three ships to minehunters ===
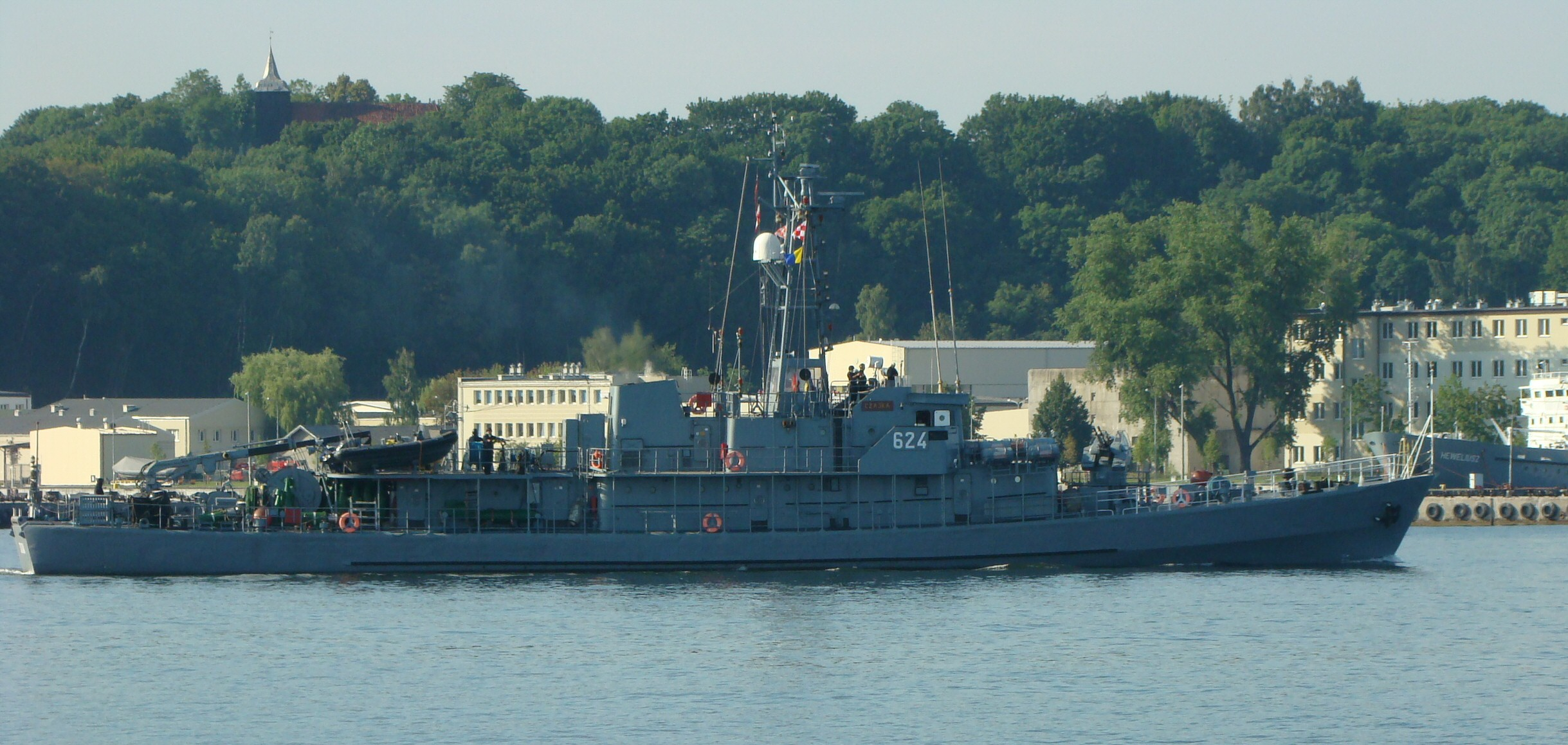
ORP Czajka after conversion, 2017

Between 1998 and 1999, ORP Mewa, ORP Czajka, and ORP Flaming were withdrawn from service and converted into minehunters of the Project 206FM class, with work completed in 1999 for Mewa, 2000 for Czajka, and 2001 for Flaming. The modernization was designed and executed at the Polish Navy Shipyard in Gdynia. The conversion involved extensive modifications to most compartments and the internal hull structure, now divided into 10 watertight compartments. Parts of the plating were replaced, and the ships received a larger superstructure, a new funnel, and a tripod mast. The superstructure housed the main command post and a two-compartment diving chamber from the Szczecin-based company Aquaticus for the new crew members – divers. The three 25 mm gun mounts were replaced with a single ZU-23-2MR Wróbel II gun-missile system with two 23 mm cannons, while the two quadruple Strela-2M missile launchers were retained, and the depth charge racks were removed. The mine rails were adapted to carry either 12 OS mines, 12 MMD-1 mines, 12 MMD-2 mines, or 6 OD mines. Minesweeping equipment was upgraded to include the MT-2W contact sweep with Bofors explosive cutters, the TEM-PE-2MA electromagnetic sweep, the MTA-2 acoustic sweep, and two remotely operated underwater vehicle (ROVs) of the Ukwiał system, designed and built at Gdańsk University of Technology. The electronic equipment was modernized to include the Pstrokosz command support system, a Decca Bridge Master navigation radar, SHL-100MA and SHL-200 Flaming B towed sonar systems, the Jemiołuszka precision navigation system, and the Supraśl IFF system. Additional equipment included a ECDIS digital chart set from FIN Skog, Rohde & Schwarz HF and UHF radios, a C.Plath fibre optic gyrocompass, an STN Atlas Doppler log, and the MORS shipboard communication system. Six WNP81/9 Jastrząb decoy launchers were also added. On Mewa and Czajka, the Fiat engines were replaced with Cegielski-Sulzer 6AL25/30 diesel engines, and new generator sets were installed. Uniquely, Flaming was equipped with a Norwegian Brunvoll maneuvering thruster and a German Schottel azimuth thruster, controlled by a Polish dynamic positioning system from Szczecin's Autocomp. Environmental upgrades included a new sewage treatment system, recovered oil and oily water tanks, and a desalinator. The modernization increased the full displacement to 507 tonnes and the crew to 54 personnel. The total cost of modernizing the three ships was 110 million PLN.

=== Later service ===
The last two unconverted Project 206F minesweepers, ORP Tukan and ORP Rybitwa, were decommissioned in 2000 and 2002, respectively. The three modernized Project 206FM minehunters resumed active service, rotating through NATO standing mine countermeasures groups and participating in numerous international exercises, neutralizing World War II ordnance in Polish and foreign waters.

Due to wear, ORP Mewa was decommissioned on 30 December 2019 after over 52 years of service, followed by ORP Flaming on 4 December 2020 after 54 years. The final Project 206FM ship, ORP Czajka, was decommissioned on 8 December 2021.

== Bibliography ==
- Kamiński, Jerzy M. (2008). "Na drodze do pierwszego polskiego niszczyciela min. Okręty projektu 206FM" [On the Path to the First Polish Minehunter: Project 206FM Ships]. Morze, Statki i Okręty (in Polish). 11 (83). Magnum-X. ISSN 1426-529X.
- Kamiński, Jerzy M. (2008). "Współczesne "ptaszki" czyli historia projektu 206" [Modern "Birds" or the History of Project 206]. Morze, Statki i Okręty (in Polish). 9 (81). Magnum-X. ISSN 1426-529X.
- Pater, Walter (1994). "Polskie trałowce typu Orlik (proj. "206F")" [Polish Orlik-Class Minesweepers (Project 206F)]. Okręty Wojenne (in Polish). 11. Tarnowskie Góry. ISSN 1231-014X.
