= Pelican hook =

Nautical rigging device

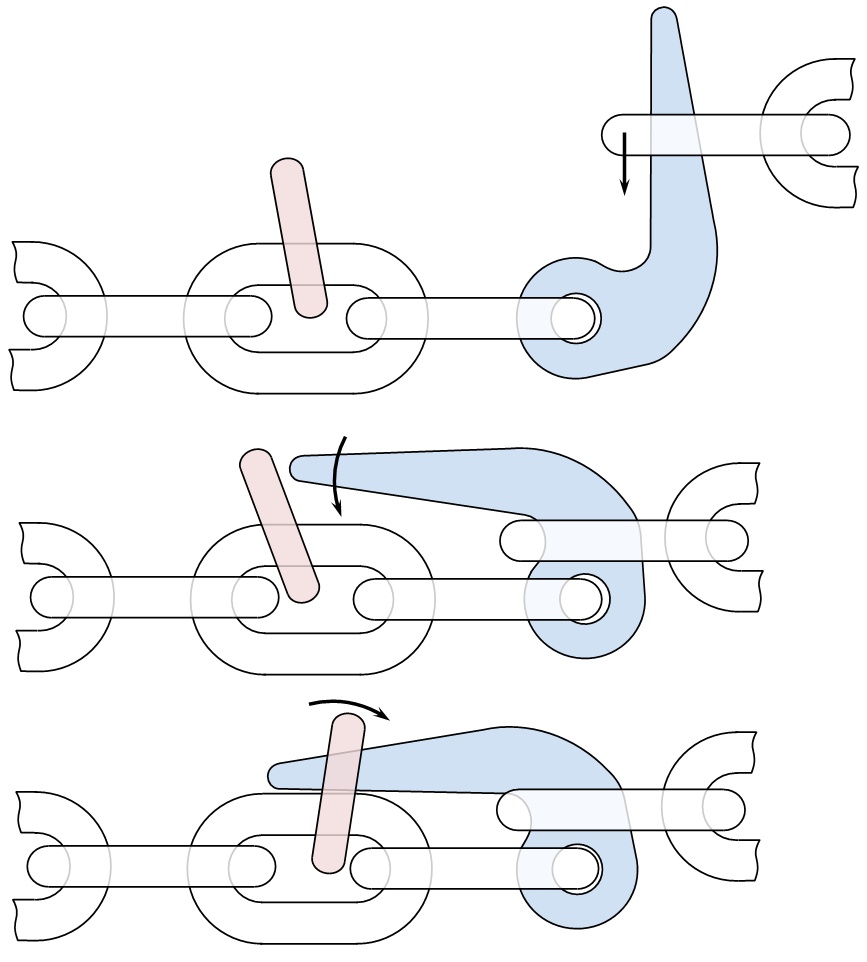
A pelican hook being closed.

A pelican hook is a piece of nautical rigging hardware

It is composed of a hinged link held closed by a circumferential link capable of being released under load. Small examples are held closed by hand while the retaining link is displaced while larger examples are hit with a hammer or sledge hammer to release.

The asymmetric appearance of the two hinged pieces is similar in appearance to a pelican's beak. It is frequently used to secure ships' anchors and life raft canisters but has many other applications.
