= Projekt 206FM-class minehunter =

1960s Polish Navy mine-countermeasure vessels

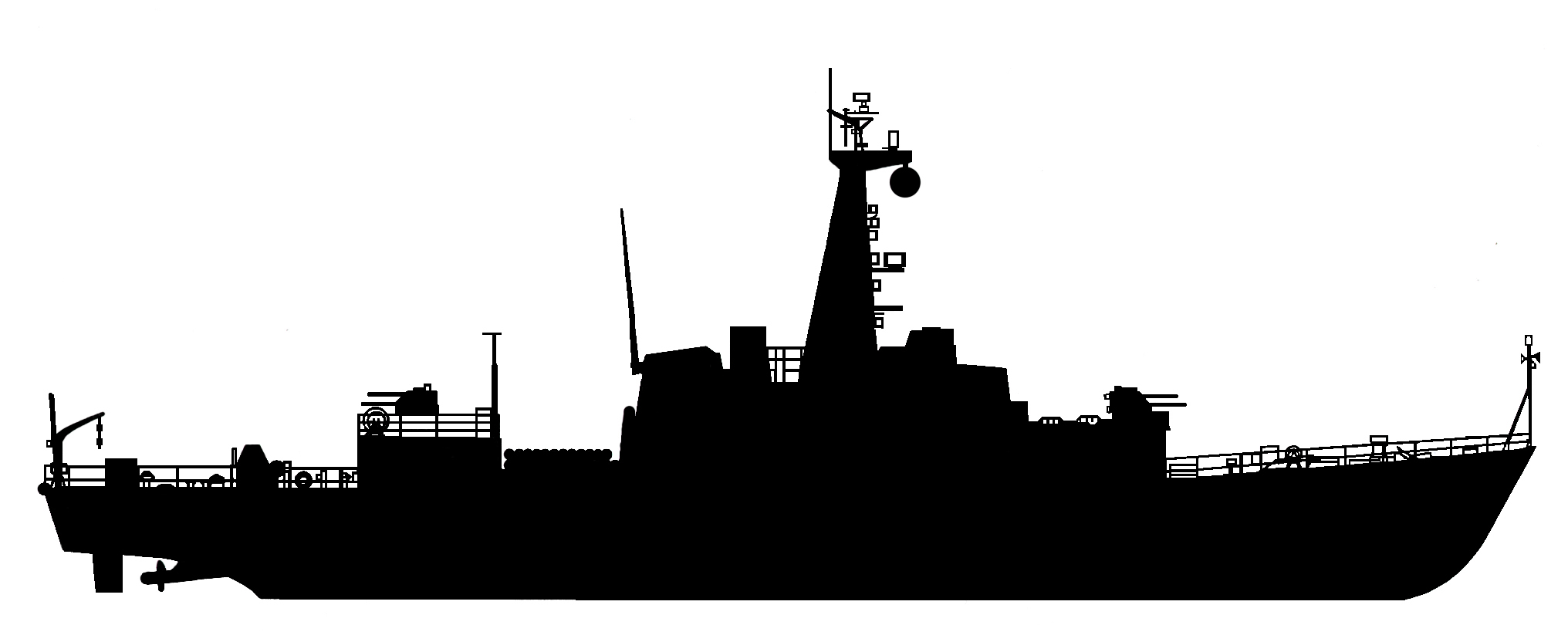
- Type 206FM silhouette

Class overview
- Name: Project 206F class minesweeper/; project 206FM class minehunter
- Builders: Komuny Paryskiej Shipyard; Vostochnaya Verf
- Operators: Polish Navy
- Succeeded by: Kormoran 2
- Built: 1961-1965
- Completed: 12
- Active: 0
- Retired: 12
- Scrapped: 9

General characteristics
- Type: Minesweeper / minehunter
- Displacement: 426 t (419 long tons) standard; 503 t (495 long tons) full load
- Length: 58.2 m (190 ft 11 in)
- Beam: 7.7 m (25 ft 3 in)
- Draught: 2.14 m (7 ft 0 in)
- Propulsion: 2 × Sulzer-Cegielski 1,700 hp (1,268 kW) diesel engines, 2 shafts
- Speed: 18 knots (33 km/h; 21 mph)
- Complement: 49
- Armament: 3 x 2M-3 (25mm dual-barrel naval cannons)

The Project 206FM class (NATO reporting name: "Krogulec"-class), originally designated Project 206F, were mine-countermeasure vessels of the Polish Navy built during the mid-1960s.

== Class history ==
The twelve ships of this class were built at the Komuny Paryskiej Shipyard in Gdynia as coastal minesweepers Project 206F class, and served as the 9th Coastal Defence Flotilla at Hel. Most of the class were decommissioned by the early 1990s, though three were modernised around 2000, and remain in service as minehunters (their designation was changed to Project 206FM for Modernized). Last ship war retired from service on 8 December 2021.

== Ships ==
The 12 ships in the class were:

Name	Launched	Commissioned	Decommissioned
ORP Orlik (613)	?	?	1989
ORP Krogulec (614)	?	?	?
ORP Jastrząb (615)	?	?	1990
ORP Kormoran (616)	?	?	1993
ORP Czapla (617)	?	?	1990
ORP Albatros (618)	?	?	?
ORP Pelikan (619)	?	?	1993
ORP Tukan (620)	?	?	?
ORP Flaming (621)	5 May 1965	11 October 1966	4 December 2020
ORP Rybitwa (622)	?	?	?
ORP Mewa (623)	22 December 1966	9 May 1967	30 December 2019
ORP Czajka (624)	17 December 1966	17 June 1967	8 December 2021

Gallery
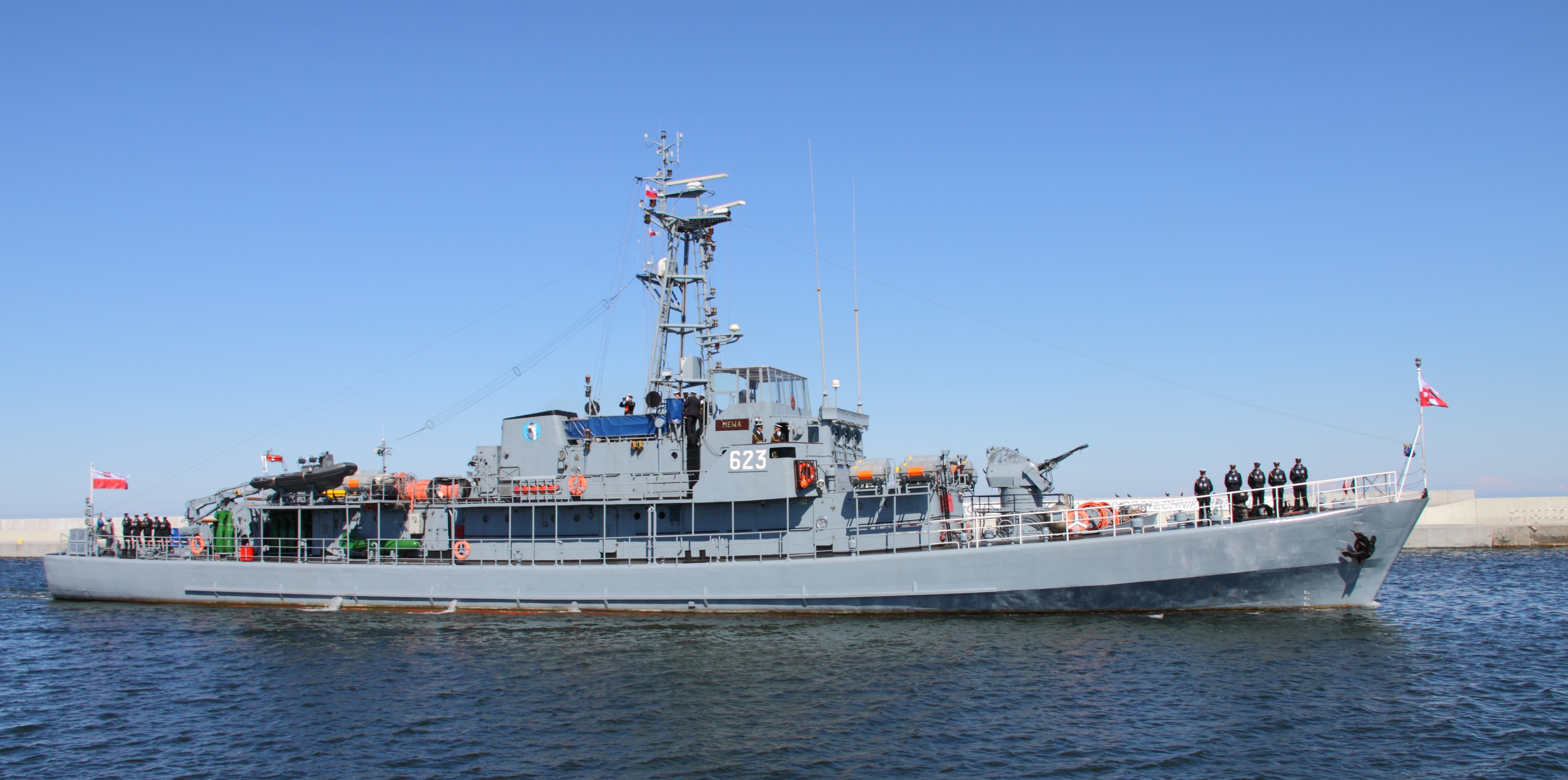
ORP Mewa in June 2011

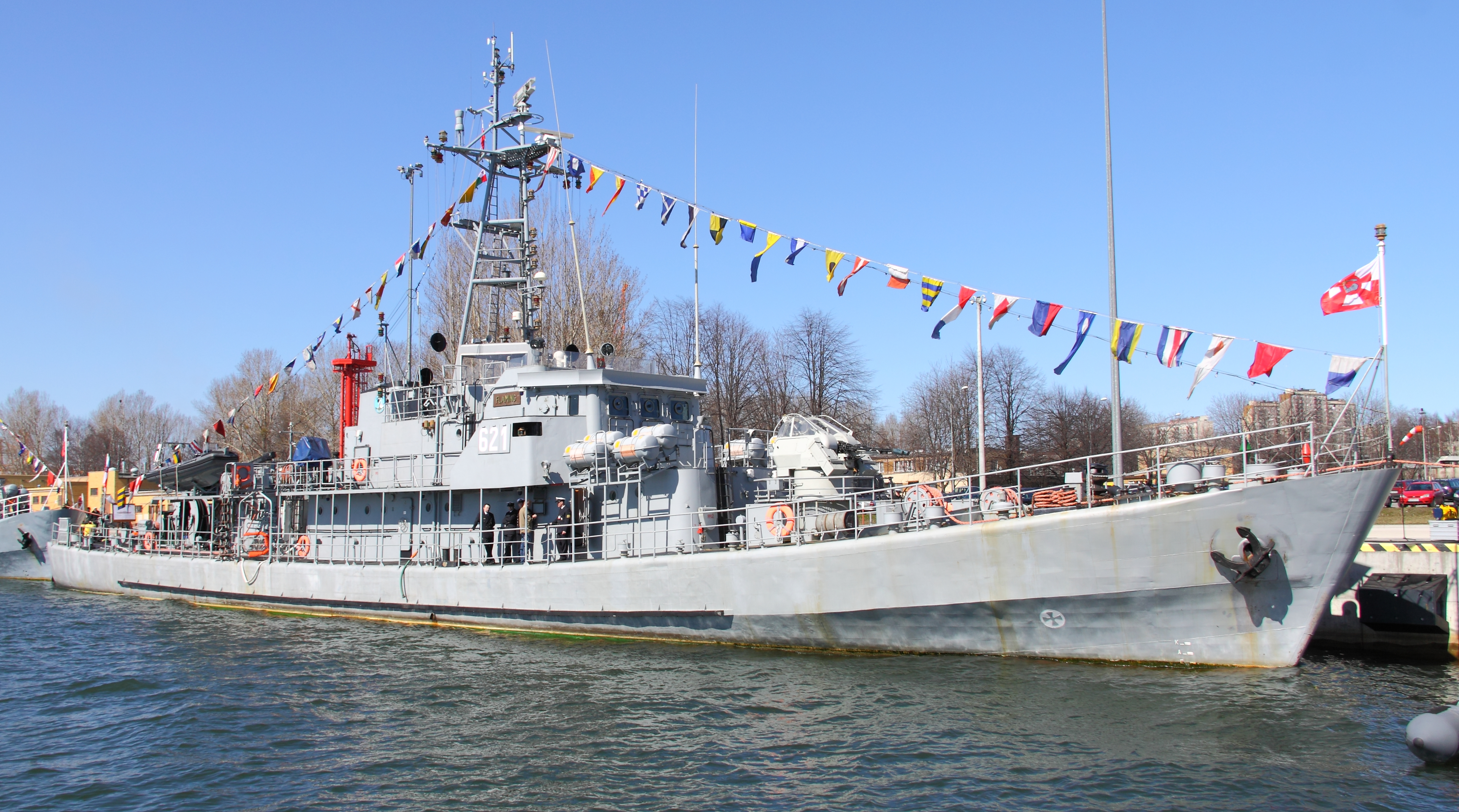
ORP Flaming in April 2012
