= Ludwik Janczyszyn =

Polish officer

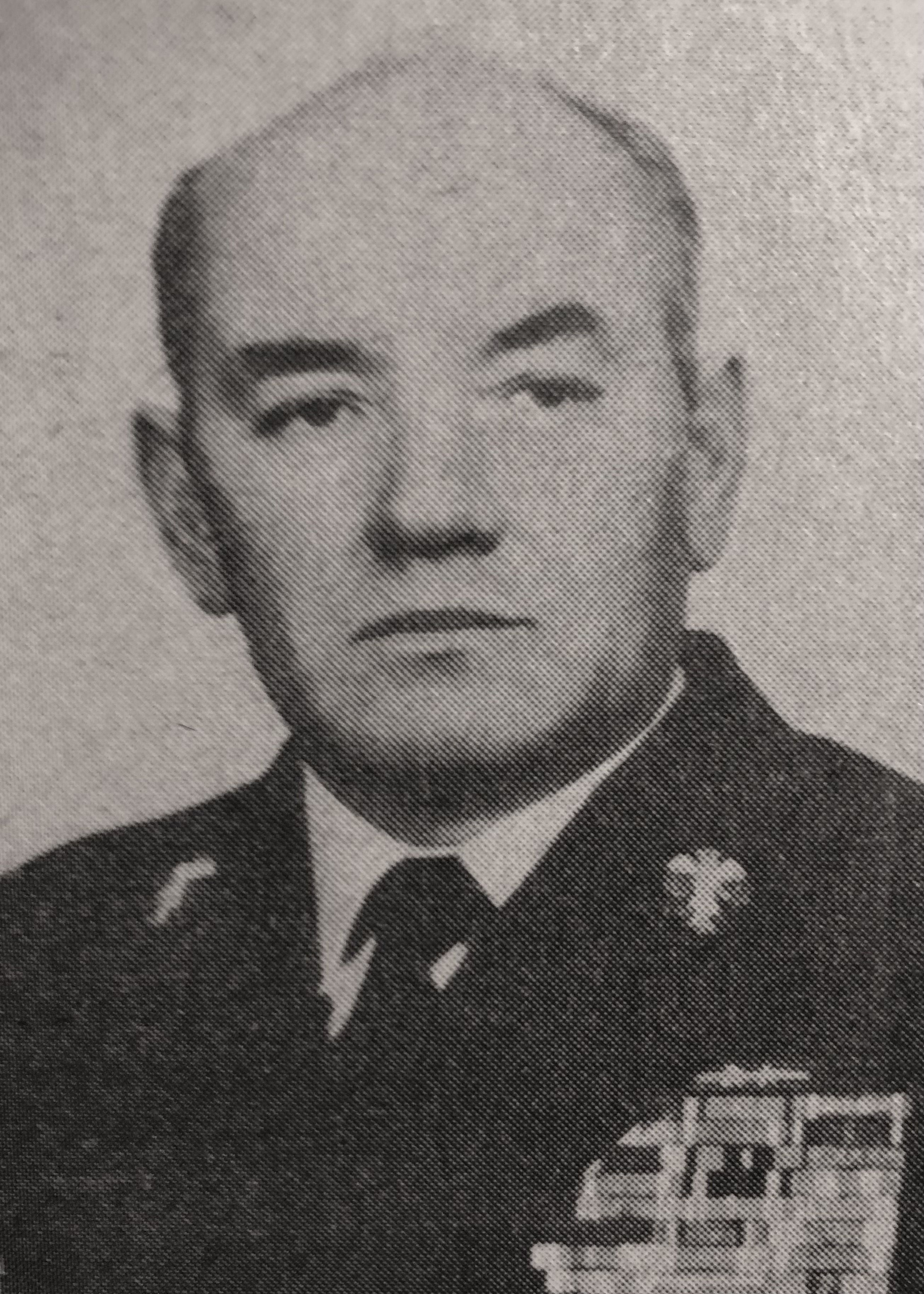
- Born: 11 May 1923; Krasne, Second Polish Republic
- Died: 27 July 1994 (aged 71); Gdynia, Poland
- Military career
- Allegiance: Polish People's Republic
- Branch: Polish Navy
- Service years: 1944-1990
- Rank: Admirał (Vice admiral)
- Units: ORP Orlik; General Staff of the Navy
- Commands: Commander of the Navy
- Conflicts: Second World War
- Awards

Ludwik Janczyszyn (11 May 1923 - 27 July 1994) was a Polish admiral, infantry officer and naval deck officer. He was commander of the Polish Navy in the years 1969–1986, and a member of the Sejm of the Polish People's Republic. He was also a member of the Military Council of National Salvation, and ambassador of the Polish People's Republic to Syria and Jordan.

== Early life and education ==
He was born in Krasne as a son of Maria and Marcin. After graduating from public primary school in 1935, he started working in a locksmith's workshop.

== Military career ==
In 1943, he joined the Soviet partisans in Podolia, the unit commanded by Sydir Kovpak.

In October the same year, he was drafted into the Red Army, in which he served until 1944 in Extermination battalion. In June 1944, he was transferred to newly formed Polish People's Army and was sent for training to the Infantry Officers' School of the 1st Polish Army. He graduated in November with the rank of Standard-bearer. Then he served in 1st Tadeusz Kościuszko Infantry Division and took part in the battles for Warsaw and the breaking of the Pomeranian Wall. He was wounded twice, during the fighting near Mirosławiec and while crossing the Oder. After the end of the war, in 1946, he took part in fights with cursed soldiers.

In the years 1946–1949, he studied at the Naval Officers' School in Gdynia. After graduation he was appointed commander of the ORP Orlik. He held this position until 1950. In the same year, he began his service onboard the ORP Błyskawica as deputy commander. In the years 1950-1952, he was sent to Leningrad to complete Higher Academic Course of Navigation and Artillery. In the years 1952-1954, he was chief of staff at the Command of the Protection of the Main Naval Base in Gdynia.

From November 1954 to July 1955, he was commander of the Protection of the Main Naval Base. Then from 1955 to 1956, he again studied at the Soviet Naval Academy in Leningrad. After returning to Poland, he took the position of head of the Combat Training Department at the Main Naval Staff. Later, he obtained the position of head of the Operational and Training Department. In December 1957, he became deputy chief of the Naval Staff. On July 13, 1960, by resolution of the State Council of the Polish People's Republic, he was promoted to the rank of Commodore. From November 1969 to February 1986, he commanded the Navy. On October 6, 1970, he was promoted to the rank of Rear admiral and on October 5, 1978, to the rank of Admiral.

== Political career ==
From October 1946, he was a member of the Polish Workers' Party, and from 1948, a member of the Polish United Workers' Party. He held the position of deputy member of the Central Committee of the Party. In the years 1981–1983, he was a member of the Commission of the Central Committee, established to explain the causes and course of social conflicts in the history of the People's Republic of Poland. He held the mandate of a member of the Sejm of the Polish People's Republic in the years 1972–1989. In the years 1974–1990, he was also a member of the Supreme Council of the Society of Fighters for Freedom and Democracy.

During Martial Law, he joined the Military Council of National Salvation. In July 1986, the Council of State of the Polish People's Republic appointed him ambassador to Syria, and in October 1986, also to Jordan. At the end of 1988, he was dismissed from his position. On November 7, 1989, he was officially bid farewell by the Minister of National Defense, General of the Army Florian Siwicki. He was retired on February 9, 1990.

== Death ==
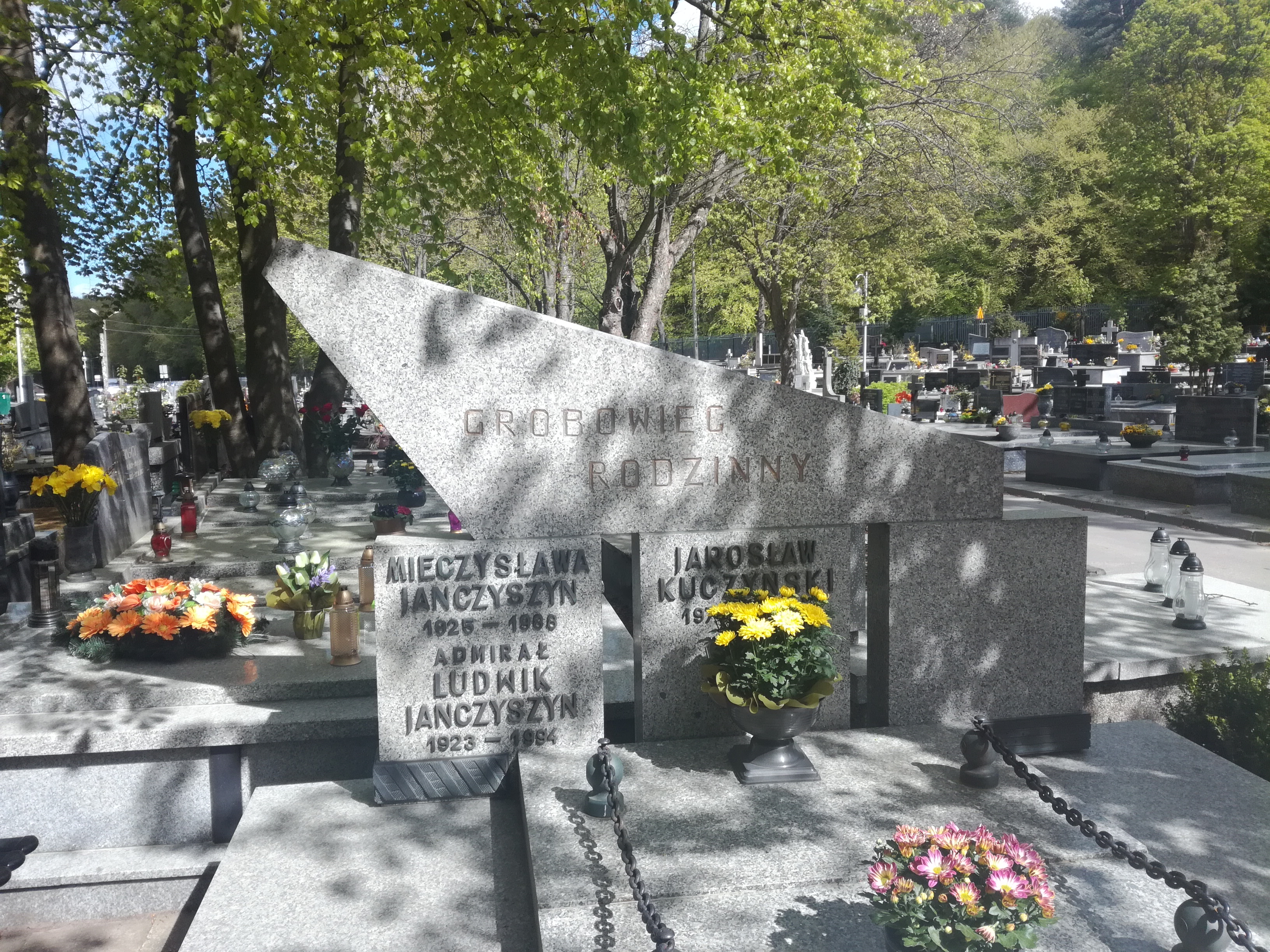
The grave of Admiral Ludwik Janczyszyn at the Witomin Cemetery in Gdynia

He died on July 27, 1994, and was buried at the Witomin Cemetery in Gdynia.

== Promotions ==
- Chorąży (Standard-bearer) - 1944
- Podporucznik (Second lieutenant) - 1946
- Porucznik marynarki (Lieutenant junior grade) - 1949
- Kapitan marynarki (Lieutenant) - 1952
- Komandor podporucznik (Lieutenant commander) - 1953
- Komandor porucznik (Commander) - 1954
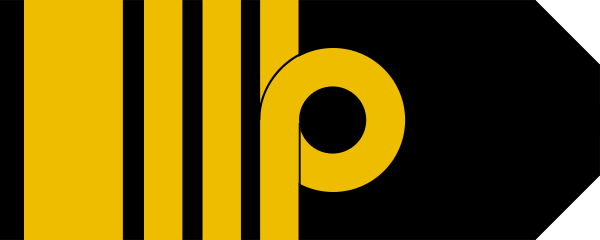
- Komandor (Captain) - 1955
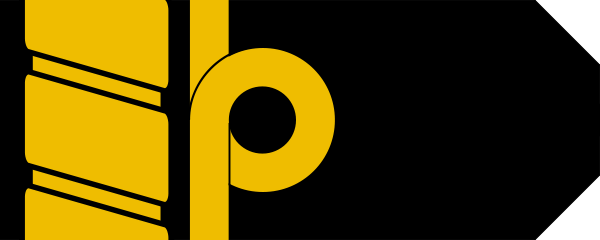
- Kontradmirał (Commodore) - 1960
- Wiceadmirał (Rear admiral) - 1970
- Admirał (Vice admiral) - 1978

== Awards and decorations ==
- Polish
  - Order of the Banner of Labour, 1st Class (1973)
  - Order of the Banner of Labour, 2nd Class (1963)
  - Order of the Cross of Grunwald, 3rd Class (1946)
  - Commander's Cross of the Order of Polonia Restituta (1989)
  - Officer's Cross of the Order of Polonia Restituta (1968)
  - Knight's Cross of the Order of Polonia Restituta (1959)
  - Cross of Valour (1946)
  - Gold Cross of Merit (1954)
  - Silver Medal "For Merit on the Field of Glory" (1946)
  - Medal of the 30th Anniversary of People's Poland (1974)
  - Medal of the 40th Anniversary of People's Poland (1984)
  - Medal for Oder, Neisse and Baltic
  - Medal of Victory and Freedom 1945
  - Gold Medal of the Armed Forces in the Service of the Fatherland (1968)
  - Silver Medal of the Armed Forces in the Service of the Fatherland
  - Bronze Medal of the Armed Forces in the Service of the Fatherland
  - Medal of the 10th Anniversary of People's Poland (1954)
  - Medal for Participation in the Battle of Berlin
  - Silver Medal of Merit for National Defence
  - Bronze Medal of Merit for National Defence (1967)
  - Gold Medal of Merit for the Homeland Defense League
  - Medal of the National Education Commission (1973)
- Soviet
  - Order of the Red Banner (1968)
  - Order of Friendship of Peoples (1973)
  - Medal "For the Capture of Berlin"
  - Medal "For the Liberation of Warsaw"
  - Medal "For Strengthening of Brotherhood in Arms"
  - Jubilee Medal "Twenty Years of Victory in the Great Patriotic War 1941–1945"
  - Jubilee Medal "Thirty Years of Victory in the Great Patriotic War 1941–1945" (1975)
  - Jubilee Medal "Forty Years of Victory in the Great Patriotic War 1941–1945" (1985)
  - Jubilee Medal "60 Years of the Armed Forces of the USSR" (1979)
- From other countries
  - Medal "For Strengthening the Friendship of the Armed Forces", 1st Class (Czechoslovakia, 1980)
  - Medal "For Strengthening the Friendship of the Armed Forces", 2nd Class (Czechoslovakia, 1970)
  - Grand Officer of the Order of the Crown (Belgium, 1977)
  - Jubilee Medal "30 Years of the NVA" (East Germany, 1986)

== Bibliography ==
- M. Jędrzejko, M. Paszkowski, M. Krogulski, "Generals and admirals of the Third Polish Republic (1989–2002)", Wydawnictwo Von Borowiecky, Warsaw 2002
- J. Królikowski, "Admirals of the Polish Navy 1945–2004", Wydawnictwo Adam Marszałek, Toruń 2004, p. 60–63
- J. Królikowski, "Generals and Admirals of the Polish Army 1943–1990", vol. II: I–M, Toruń 2010, p. 43–46
- "Who is who in Poland 1984", Wydawnictwo Interpress, Warsaw 1984
- "Who is who in Poland 1989", Wydawnictwo Interpress, Warsaw 1989
- P. Martell, G.P. Hayes, "World military leaders", Bowker, New York 1974
- "Wojskowy Przegląd Historyczny”, 1990, no. 1–2 (131–132), p. 276
