= Anchor windlass =

Weightlifting device inside ships

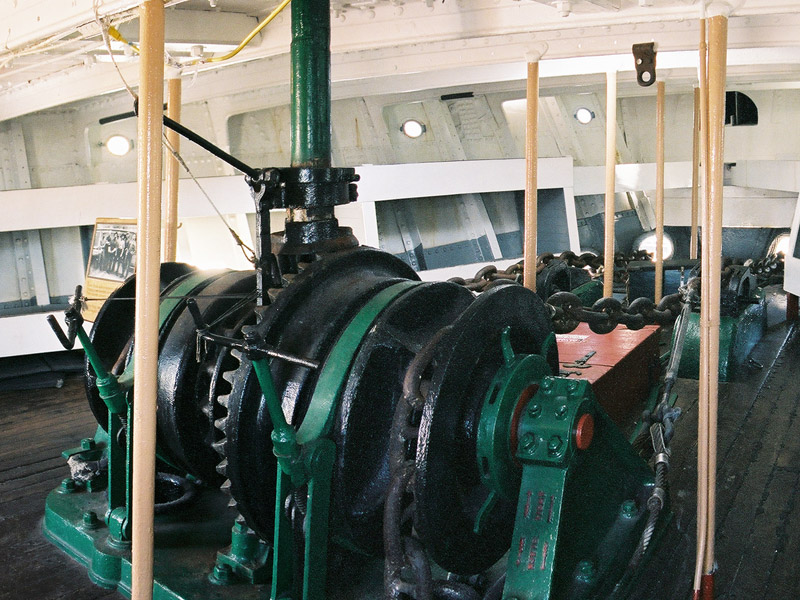
An anchor windlass within the forecastle on the main deck of the sailing ship Balclutha. The vertical shaft is rotated by crew driving a portion of the capstan above.

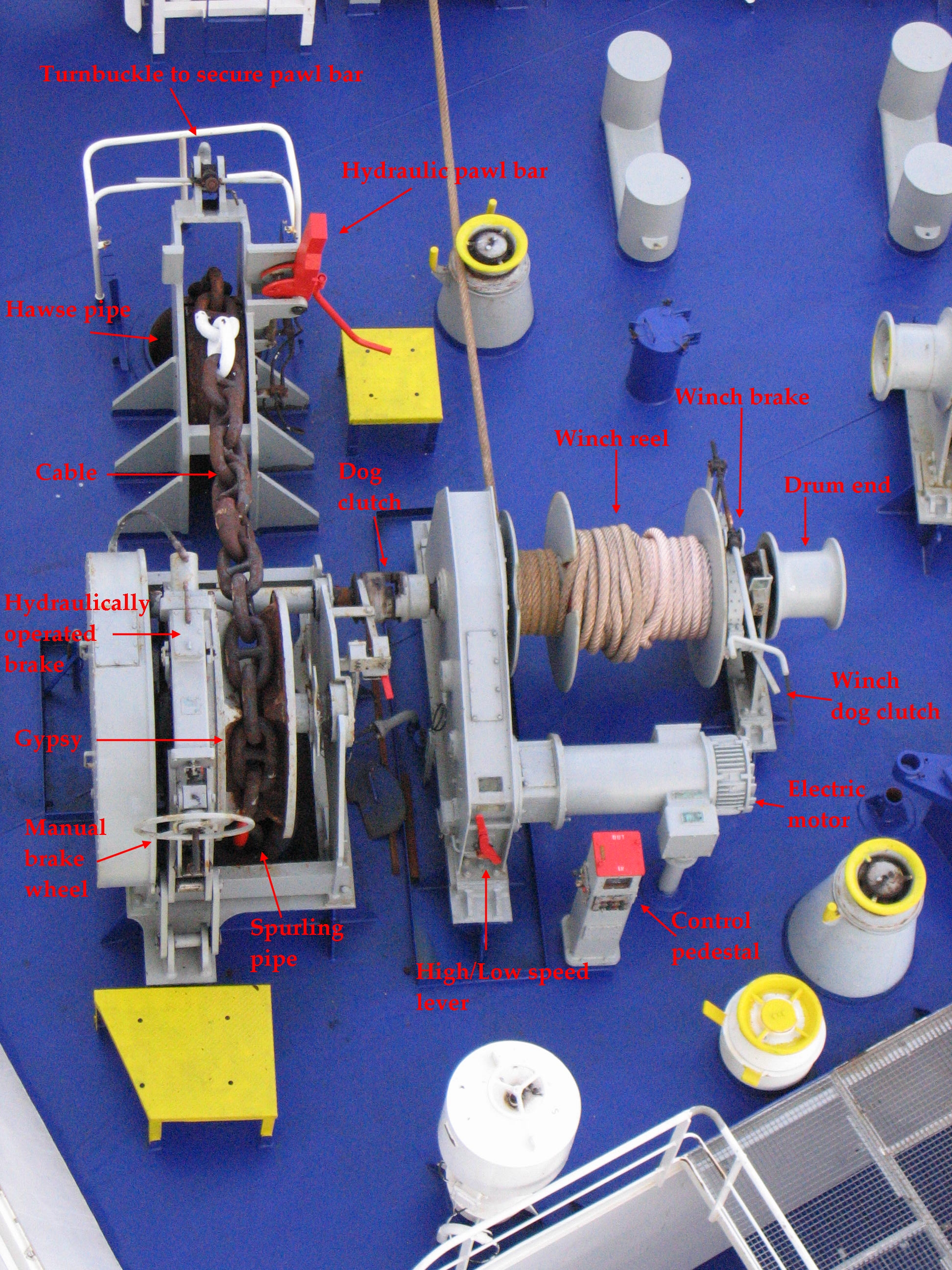
The combined port anchor windlass and winch of the modern ferry Stena Britannica. The hydraulically operated brake and pawl allows the anchor to be dropped from the ship's bridge.

A windlass is a machine used on ships that is used to let-out and heave-up equipment such as a ship's anchor or a fishing trawl. On some ships, it may be located in a specific room called the windlass room.

An anchor windlass is a machine that restrains and manipulates the anchor chain on a boat, allowing the anchor to be raised and lowered by means of chain cable. A notched wheel engages the links of the chain or the rope.

A trawl windlass is a similar machine that restrains or manipulates the trawl on a commercial fishing vessel. The trawl is a sort of big fishing net that is wound on the windlass. The fishermen either let-out the trawl or heave-up the trawl during fishing operations. A brake is provided for additional control. The windlass is usually powered by an electric or hydraulic motor operating via a gear train.

== Horizontal or vertical ==
Technically speaking, the term "windlass" refers only to horizontal winches. Vertical designs are correctly called capstans. Horizontal windlasses make use of an integral gearbox and motor assembly, all typically located above-deck, with a horizontal shaft through the unit and wheels for chain and/or rope on either side. Vertical capstans use a vertical shaft, with the motor and gearbox situated below the winch unit (usually below decks).

Horizontal windlasses offer several advantages. The unit tends to be more self-contained, protecting the machinery from the corrosive environment found on boats. The dual wheels also allow two anchors on double rollers to be serviced. Vertical capstans, for their part, allow the machinery to be placed below decks, thus lowering the center of gravity (important on boats), and also allow a flexible angle of pull (which means rope or chain can be run out to different fair leads).

It tends to be the case that smaller boats use capstans, and larger boats have windlasses, although this is by no means a hard and fast rule.

== The links from bitts to anchor ==
The anchor is shackled to the anchor cable (US anchor chain), the cable passes up through the hawsepipe, through the pawl, over the windlass gypsy (US wildcat) down through the "spurling pipe" to the chain/cable locker under the forecastle (or poop if at the stern (US fantail)) - the anchor bitts are on a bulkhead in the cable locker and the bitter end of the cable is connected to the bitts using the bitter pin, which should be able to be released from outside the locker to "slip" the anchor. This would occur if the windlass brake has slipped (in a storm, for example) and the cable has reached "the bitter end". This is the origin of the term "to the bitter end". It originally applied in sailing vessels where the cable was a rope, and the windlass or capstan was powered by many sailors below decks.

== Gypsies and wildcats ==
The wheels on either a vertical or horizontal windlass provide for either chain or line to be engaged. The wheel for line is termed a warping head, while the chain handling wheel is variously referred to as the gypsy (in the UK) or wildcat (in North America). For clarity in communication the generic term chainwheel is often used. On small craft a warping drum is sometimes used to handle both chain & rope, although particular care must be taken with sizing and compatibility of line, chain, and windlass, for this feature to work effectively.

It is important that the chainwheel match the chain size (i.e. the link pitch) closely. Even a small difference in link size or consistency can cause undue wear on the chainwheel and/or cause the chain to jump off the windlass when the winch is operating, particularly during payout, a runaway condition sometimes referred to as "water spouting" should it occur at high speed.

Nowadays, especially on large tankers and cruise ships, the windlass may be split into independent port and starboard units. In these cases they are frequently coupled with warping drums (as distinct from warping heads). In some of these the warping drums are of the self tensioning or constant tension type.

== Mechanical advantage ==
The mechanical advantage of a windlass is derived from the pulling force being multiplied by wrapping the rope around the drum.

The math for such force phenomena is described by the Capstan equation. The formula is

$$T_\text{load} = T_\text{hold}\   e^{  \mu \phi} ~,$$

where $T_\text{load}$ is the applied tension on the line, $T_\text{hold}$ is the resulting force exerted at the other side of the capstan, $\mu$ is the coefficient of friction between the rope and capstan materials, and $\phi$ is the total angle swept by all turns of the rope, measured in radians (i.e., with one full turn the angle $\phi =2\pi\,$).

While many modern windlasses require an external power source, many remain manually driven in the same manner as most sailing boats' winches for sheets.

Powered solutions include steam (antiquated), hydraulics, and electrics. Electrics are convenient and relatively cheap, but hydraulics may be more efficient and powerful if available.

In general, windlasses and their power system should be capable of lifting the anchor and all its rode (chain and rope) so that the anchor and rode hang suspended in deep water. This task should be within the windlass' rated working pull, not its maximum pull.

== Devil's claw ==
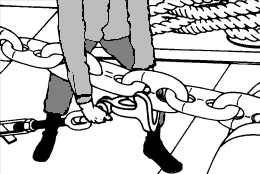
Securing a devil's claw on a large anchor chain

The devil's claw is a device that is used as a chain stopper to grab and hold an anchor chain. It consists of a turnbuckle, usually attached at the base of the anchor windlass, and a metal hook with two curved fingers that grab one link of a chain.

A devil's claw is often used on merchant ships because it is lighter and easier to manage than other types of chain stoppers, such as a pelican hook.

After hoisting the anchor and setting the windlass brake, the claw is placed on a chain link and the turnbuckle is tightened to take up the tension on the chain. If more than one stopper is used, the turnbuckles can be adjusted to evenly distribute the load.

A devil's claw cannot be released while it is under tension. To release it, the tension must first be taken up by the windlass brake. Then the turnbuckle can be loosened and removed.
