= List of ships of the Polish Navy =

This is a list of ships of the Polish Navy from the outbreak of World War II to the present day.

== Active fleet ==
=== Submarine fleet ===
Class	In service	Origin	Picture	Type	Builder	Boats	No.	Comm.	Displacement	Notes
Submarines
Kilo class (Project 877E)	1	Soviet Union		Attack Submarine (diesel-electric)	Krasnoe Sormovo	ORP Orzeł	291	29 Apr 1986	2,460 tonnes (surfaced); 3,180 tonnes (submerged)	Homeport: Gdynia

=== Surface warship fleet ===
Class	In service	Origin	Picture	Type	Builder	Boats	No.	Comm.	Displacement	Notes
Frigates (2)
Oliver Hazard Perry class	2	United States		Guided-missile frigate	Bath Iron Works	ORP Generał Kazimierz Pułaski (USS Clark)	272 (FFG-11)	25 Jun 2000 (9 May 1980)	3,650 tonnes	Homeport: Gdynia
Oliver Hazard Perry class	2	United States		Guided-missile frigate	Todd Pacific Shipyards, Los Angeles Division	ORP Generał Tadeusz Kościuszko (USS Wadsworth)	273 (FFG-9)	28 Jun 2002 (27 Feb 1976)	3,650 tonnes	Homeport: Gdynia
Corvettes (2)
Kaszub class	1	Poland		Corvette	Gdańsk Shipyard	ORP Kaszub	240	15 Mar 1987	1,200 tonnes	Homeport: Gdynia
Gawron class MEKO A100PL (Project 621)	1	Germany; Poland		Patrol corvette	Blohm + Voss (design); Stocznia Marynarki Wojennej (construction)	ORP Ślązak	241	28 Nov 2019	2,150 tonnes	Homeport: Gdynia; 5 vessels of the class were cancelled.
Fast attack craft (3)
Orkan class	3	Germany; Poland		Fast attack craft	Peene-Werft / Remontowa	ORP Orkan	421	18 Sep 1992	369 tonnes	Unfinished hulls bought by Poland, and vessels finished in Poland. Homeport: Gdynia
Orkan class	3	Germany; Poland		Fast attack craft	Peene-Werft / Remontowa	ORP Piorun	422	11 Mar 1994	369 tonnes	Unfinished hulls bought by Poland, and vessels finished in Poland. Homeport: Gdynia
Orkan class	3	Germany; Poland		Fast attack craft	Peene-Werft / Remontowa	ORP Grom	423	28 Apr 1995	369 tonnes	Unfinished hulls bought by Poland, and vessels finished in Poland. Homeport: Gdynia
Mine countermeasure ships (20)
Kontradmiral Xawery Czernicki class	1	Poland		Mine countermeasure command vessel	Northern Shipyard	ORP Kontradmiral Xawery Czernicki	511	1 Sep 2001	2,390 tonnes	Homeport: Świnoujście
Kormoran 2 class	3 (+ 3 on order)	Poland		Minehunter	Remontowa Shipbuilding SA	ORP Kormoran	601	28 Nov 2017	850 tonnes	Homeport: Gdynia
Kormoran 2 class	3 (+ 3 on order)	Poland		Minehunter	Remontowa Shipbuilding SA	ORP Albatros	602	28 Nov 2022	850 tonnes	Homeport: Gdynia
Kormoran 2 class	3 (+ 3 on order)	Poland		Minehunter	Remontowa Shipbuilding SA	ORP Mewa	603	14 Feb 2023	850 tonnes	Homeport: Gdynia
Gardno class (Projekt 207P)	12	Poland		Minesweeper	Stocznia Marynarki Wojennej	ORP Gardno	631	31 Mar 1984	217 tonnes	Homeport: Świnoujście
Gardno class (Projekt 207P)	12	Poland		Minesweeper	Stocznia Marynarki Wojennej	ORP Bukowo	632	23 Jun 1985	217 tonnes	Homeport: Świnoujście
Gardno class (Projekt 207P)	12	Poland		Minesweeper	Stocznia Marynarki Wojennej	ORP Dąbie	633	11 May 1986	217 tonnes	Homeport: Świnoujście
Gardno class (Projekt 207P)	12	Poland		Minesweeper	Stocznia Marynarki Wojennej	ORP Jamno	634	11 May 1986	217 tonnes	Homeport: Świnoujście
Gardno class (Projekt 207P)	12	Poland		Minesweeper	Stocznia Marynarki Wojennej	ORP Mielno	635	9 May 1987	217 tonnes	Homeport: Świnoujście
Gardno class (Projekt 207P)	12	Poland		Minesweeper	Stocznia Marynarki Wojennej	ORP Wicko	636	12 Oct 1987	217 tonnes	Homeport: Świnoujście
Gardno class (Projekt 207P)	12	Poland		Minesweeper	Stocznia Marynarki Wojennej	ORP Resko	637	16 Mar 1988	217 tonnes	Homeport: Świnoujście
Gardno class (Projekt 207P)	12	Poland		Minesweeper	Stocznia Marynarki Wojennej	ORP Sarbsko	638	12 Oct 1988	217 tonnes	Homeport: Świnoujście
Gardno class (Projekt 207P)	12	Poland		Minesweeper	Stocznia Marynarki Wojennej	ORP Necko	639	9 May 1989	217 tonnes	Homeport: Świnoujście
Gardno class (Projekt 207P)	12	Poland		Minesweeper	Stocznia Marynarki Wojennej	ORP Nakło	640	2 Mar 1990	217 tonnes	Homeport: Świnoujście
Gardno class (Projekt 207P)	12	Poland		Minesweeper	Stocznia Marynarki Wojennej	ORP Drużno	641	21 Sep 1990	217 tonnes	Homeport: Świnoujście
Gardno class (Projekt 207P)	12	Poland		Minesweeper	Stocznia Marynarki Wojennej	ORP Hańcza	642	1 Mar 1991	217 tonnes	Homeport: Świnoujście
Mamry class (Projekt 207M)	4	Poland		Minesweeper	Stocznia Marynarki Wojennej	ORP Mamry	643	25 Sep 1992	216 tonnes	Homeport: Gdynia
Mamry class (Projekt 207M)	4	Poland		Minesweeper	Stocznia Marynarki Wojennej	ORP Wigry	644	14 May 1993	216 tonnes	Homeport: Gdynia
Mamry class (Projekt 207M)	4	Poland		Minesweeper	Stocznia Marynarki Wojennej	ORP Śniardwy	645	28 Jan 1994	216 tonnes	Homeport: Gdynia
Mamry class (Projekt 207M)	4	Poland		Minesweeper	Stocznia Marynarki Wojennej	ORP Wdzydze	646	2 Dec 1994	216 tonnes	Homeport: Gdynia
Minelayers / landing ships (8)
Lublin class	5	Poland		Mine-layers / landing ships	Northern Shipyard	ORP Lublin	821	12 Oct 1989	1,745 tonnes	Homeport: Świnoujście
Lublin class	5	Poland		Mine-layers / landing ships	Northern Shipyard	ORP Gniezno	822	23 Feb 1990	1,745 tonnes	Homeport: Świnoujście
Lublin class	5	Poland		Mine-layers / landing ships	Northern Shipyard	ORP Kraków	823	27 Jun 1990	1,745 tonnes	Homeport: Świnoujście
Lublin class	5	Poland		Mine-layers / landing ships	Northern Shipyard	ORP Poznań	824	8 Mar 1991	1,745 tonnes	Homeport: Świnoujście
Lublin class	5	Poland		Mine-layers / landing ships	Northern Shipyard	ORP Toruń	825	24 May 1991	1,745 tonnes	Homeport: Świnoujście
Project 716	3	Poland		Landing cutter	–	KTr-11	851	1988	176 tonnes	Homeport: Świnoujście
Project 716	3	Poland		Landing cutter	–	KTr-12	852	1991	176 tonnes	Homeport: Świnoujście
Project 716	3	Poland		Landing cutter	–	KTr-13	853	1991	176 tonnes	Homeport: Świnoujście
Rescue ships (4)
Piast class	2	Poland		Multi-task rescue-salvage ship	Stocznia Północna	ORP Piast	281	26 Jan 1974	1,600 tonnes	Homeport: Gdynia
Piast class	2	Poland		Multi-task rescue-salvage ship	Stocznia Północna	ORP Lech	282	30 Nov 1974	1,600 tonnes	Homeport: Gdynia
Zbyszko class	2	Poland		Salvage and rescue ship	Ustka shipyard	ORP Zbyszko	R-14	8 Nov 1991	380 tonnes	Homeport: Gdynia
Zbyszko class	2	Poland		Salvage and rescue ship	Ustka shipyard	ORP Maćko	R-15	20 Mar 1992	380 tonnes	Homeport: Gdynia
SIGINT (2)
Nawigator class (Project 863)	2	Poland		Electronic reconnaissance ship	Remontowa	ORP Navigator	262	17 Feb 1975	1,675 tonnes	Homeport: Gdynia
Nawigator class (Project 863)	2	Poland		Electronic reconnaissance ship	Remontowa	ORP Hydrograf	263	8 May 1976	1,675 tonnes	Homeport: Gdynia

=== Auxiliary fleet ===
Class	In service	Origin	Picture	Type	Builder	Boats	No.	Comm.	Displacement	Notes
Replenishment ships (2)
Bałtyk class	1	Poland		Fleet tanker	Stocznia Gdynia	ORP Bałtyk	Z-1	11 Mar 1991	3,000 tonnes	Homeport: Gdynia
B199 class	1	Poland		Fleet tanker	Wrocław River Shipyard	–	Z-8	21 Jul 1970	1,225 tonnes	Homeport: Świnoujście
Hydrographic survey ships (2)
Heweliusz class (Project 874)	2	Poland		Survey ship	Northern Shipyard	ORP Heweliusz	265	27 Nov 1982	1,200 tonnes	Homeport: Gdynia
Heweliusz class (Project 874)	2	Poland		Survey ship	Northern Shipyard	ORP Arctowski	266	27 Nov 1982	1,200 tonnes	Homeport: Gdynia
Tugboats (12)
B860 class	6	Poland		Tugboat	Remontowa Shipbuilding SA	ORP Bolko	H-11	2020	490 tonnes	Homeport: Świnoujście
B860 class	6	Poland		Tugboat	Remontowa Shipbuilding SA	ORP Semko	H-12	2020	490 tonnes	Homeport: Świnoujście
B860 class	6	Poland		Tugboat	Remontowa Shipbuilding SA	ORP Przemko	H-13	2021	490 tonnes	Homeport: Świnoujście
B860 class	6	Poland		Tugboat	Remontowa Shipbuilding SA	ORP Gniewko	H-1	2020	490 tonnes	Homeport: Gdynia
B860 class	6	Poland		Tugboat	Remontowa Shipbuilding SA	ORP Mieszko	H-2	2020	490 tonnes	Homeport: Gdynia
B860 class	6	Poland		Tugboat	Remontowa Shipbuilding SA	ORP Leszko	H-3	2021	490 tonnes	Homeport: Gdynia
H-900/II class	3	Poland		Tugboat	Gospodarka morska	–	H-4	1980	218 tonnes	Homeport: Świnoujście
H-900/II class	3	Poland		Tugboat	Gospodarka morska	–	H-5	1981	218 tonnes	Homeport: Gdynia
H-900/II class	3	Poland		Tugboat	Gospodarka morska	–	H-7	1981	218 tonnes	Homeport: Gdynia
H-960 class	1	Poland		Tugboat	Gospodarka morska	–	H-8	1993	332 tonnes	Homeport: Świnoujście
B820 class	2	Poland		Tugboat	Eugeniusz Kwiatkowski Shipyard	–	H-9	1993	153 tonnes	Homeport: Świnoujście
B820 class	2	Poland		Tugboat	Eugeniusz Kwiatkowski Shipyard	–	H-10	1993	153 tonnes	Homeport: Świnoujście
Cutters and motorboats (15)
Wildcat 40 class	4	Ireland		Hydrographic cutter	Safehaven Marine	–	MH-1	2015	18.5 tonnes	Homeport: Świnoujście
Wildcat 40 class	4	Ireland		Hydrographic cutter	Safehaven Marine	–	MH-2	2015	18.5 tonnes	Homeport: Gdynia
Wildcat 40 class	4	Ireland		Hydrographic cutter	Safehaven Marine	–	MH-3	2015	18.5 tonnes	Homeport: Gdynia
Wildcat 40 class	4	Ireland		Hydrographic cutter	Safehaven Marine	–	MH-4	2015	18.5 tonnes	Homeport: Gdynia
Project 4234	2	Poland		Hydrographic cutter	Wisla Shipyard	–	K-4	1989	45 tonnes	Homeport: Gdynia
Project 4234	2	Poland		Hydrographic cutter	Wisla Shipyard	–	K-10	1989	45 tonnes	Homeport: Gdynia
Project 4142	3	Poland		Transport and passenger cutters	Tczew River Shipyard	–	K-5	1988	45 tonnes	Homeport: Gdynia
Project 4142	3	Poland		Transport and passenger cutters	Tczew River Shipyard	–	K-7	1988	45 tonnes	Homeport: Świnoujście
Project 4142	3	Poland		Transport and passenger cutters	Tczew River Shipyard	–	K-9	1989	45 tonnes	Homeport: Gdynia
Project M35/MW	3	Poland		Mooring motorboats	Tczew River Shipyard	–	M-12	1983	28,6 tonnes	Homeport: Świnoujście
Project M35/MW	3	Poland		Mooring motorboats	Tczew River Shipyard	–	M-21	1983	28,6 tonnes	Homeport: Świnoujście
Project M35/MW	3	Poland		Mooring motorboats	Tczew River Shipyard	–	M-22	1984	28,6 tonnes	Homeport: Gdynia
Torpedo trials craft (1)
Kormoran class	1	Poland		Torpedo trials craft	–	–	K-8	1971	133 tonnes	Homeport: Gdynia
Degaussing vessels (2)
Project B208	2	Poland		Degaussing vessel	–	–	SD-11	1971	595 tonnes	Homeport: Gdynia
Project B208	2	Poland		Degaussing vessel	–	–	SD-13	1972	595 tonnes	Homeport: Gdynia

=== Training ships ===
Class	In service	Origin	Picture	Type	Builder	Boats	No.	Comm.	Displacement	Notes
Wodnik class	1	Poland		Training ship	–	ORP Wodnik	251	1976	1,745 tonnes	Homeport: Gdynia
Iskra class	1	Poland		Sail training ship	–	ORP Iskra	253	1982	299 tonnes	Homeport: Gdynia

=== Museum ships ===
Class	Quantity	Origin	Picture	Type	Builder	Boats	No.	Comm.	Displacement	Notes
Grom class	1	United Kingdom		Destroyer	J. Samuel White	ORP Błyskawica	H34	1937	2,144 tonnes	Homeport: Gdynia.

== Future fleet ==
=== Confirmed orders ===
Class	On order	Origin	Picture	Type	Builder	Boats	No.	Comm.	Displacement	Notes
Submarines (4)
Södermanland class (A17 class)	1	Sweden		Attack Submarine (AIP / diesel-electric)	Kockums	HSwMS Södermanland	Söd	2027	1,400 tonnes (surfaced); 1,500 tonnes (submerged)	Lease until 2032 as a gap-filler, and to be used to train the Polish Navy and build experience
Blekinge class (A26 class)	3	Sweden	–	Attack Submarine (AIP / diesel-electric)	Saab Kockums	–	–	2031	1,925 tonnes (surfaced); 2,100 tonnes (submerged)	Firm order signed in June 2026.
Blekinge class (A26 class)	3	Sweden	–	Attack Submarine (AIP / diesel-electric)	Saab Kockums	–	–	–	1,925 tonnes (surfaced); 2,100 tonnes (submerged)	Firm order signed in June 2026.
Blekinge class (A26 class)	3	Sweden	–	Attack Submarine (AIP / diesel-electric)	Saab Kockums	–	–	2038	1,925 tonnes (surfaced); 2,100 tonnes (submerged)	Firm order signed in June 2026.
Frigates (3)
Wicher class Arrowhead 140 (Type 31)	3	Denmark; United Kingdom; Poland	(illustration, same hull)	Guided-missile frigate	Design: OMT / Babcock; Builder:PGZ Stocznia Wojenna	ORP Wicher	–	2029	7,000 tonnes	Homeport: Gdynia.
Wicher class Arrowhead 140 (Type 31)	3	Denmark; United Kingdom; Poland	(illustration, same hull)	Guided-missile frigate	Design: OMT / Babcock; Builder:PGZ Stocznia Wojenna	ORP Burza	–	2030	7,000 tonnes	Homeport: Gdynia.
Wicher class Arrowhead 140 (Type 31)	3	Denmark; United Kingdom; Poland	(illustration, same hull)	Guided-missile frigate	Design: OMT / Babcock; Builder:PGZ Stocznia Wojenna	ORP Huragan	–	2031	7,000 tonnes	Homeport: Gdynia.
Mine countermeasure ships (3)
Kormoran 2 class	3	Poland		Mine countermeasure vessels	Remontowa Shipbuilding SA	ORP Jaskółka	604	2026 - 2027	850 tonnes	Homeport: Świnoujście
Kormoran 2 class	3	Poland		Mine countermeasure vessels	Remontowa Shipbuilding SA	ORP Rybitwa	605	2026 - 2027	850 tonnes	Homeport: Świnoujście
Kormoran 2 class	3	Poland		Mine countermeasure vessels	Remontowa Shipbuilding SA	ORP Czajka	606	2026 - 2027	850 tonnes	Homeport: Świnoujście
Signal intelligence (2)
Jerzy Różycki class	2	Poland; Sweden	(illustration)	SIGINT / reconnaissance ship	Remontowa Shipbuilding SA (builder); Saab (design and electronic warfare suite and integration)	ORP Jerzy Różycki	261	2027	2,200 tonnes	Homeport: Gdynia.
Jerzy Różycki class	2	Poland; Sweden	(illustration)	SIGINT / reconnaissance ship	Remontowa Shipbuilding SA (builder); Saab (design and electronic warfare suite and integration)	ORP Henryk Zygalski	264	2027	2,200 tonnes	Homeport: Gdynia.
Rescue ships (1)
Project 108	1	Poland	–	Submarine rescue and seabed warfare vessel	PGZ Stocznia Wojenna	–	–	2029	6,500 tones	
Hydrographic survey ships (2)
Project 876	2	Poland		Hydrographic survey ship	Remontowa Shipbuilding SA	–	–	–	–	Financed by SAFE loans.
Project 876	2	Poland		Hydrographic survey ship	Remontowa Shipbuilding SA	–	–	–	–	Financed by SAFE loans.

=== Planned or potential orders ===
Class	Potential quantity	Origin	Picture	Type	Builder	Boats	No.	Comm.	Displacement	Notes
Frigates (5)
Wicher class Arrowhead 140 (Type 31)	5	Denmark; United Kingdom; Poland	(illustration, same hull)	Guided missile frigate	Design: OMT / Babcock; Builder: PGZ Stocznia Wojenna	–	–	–	7,000 tonnes	Option for 5 additional ships of this class as part of the contract.
Wicher class Arrowhead 140 (Type 31)	5	Denmark; United Kingdom; Poland	(illustration, same hull)	Guided missile frigate	Design: OMT / Babcock; Builder: PGZ Stocznia Wojenna	–	–	–	7,000 tonnes	Option for 5 additional ships of this class as part of the contract.
Wicher class Arrowhead 140 (Type 31)	5	Denmark; United Kingdom; Poland	(illustration, same hull)	Guided missile frigate	Design: OMT / Babcock; Builder: PGZ Stocznia Wojenna	–	–	–	7,000 tonnes	Option for 5 additional ships of this class as part of the contract.
Wicher class Arrowhead 140 (Type 31)	5	Denmark; United Kingdom; Poland	(illustration, same hull)	Guided missile frigate	Design: OMT / Babcock; Builder: PGZ Stocznia Wojenna	–	–	–	7,000 tonnes	Option for 5 additional ships of this class as part of the contract.
Wicher class Arrowhead 140 (Type 31)	5	Denmark; United Kingdom; Poland	(illustration, same hull)	Guided missile frigate	Design: OMT / Babcock; Builder: PGZ Stocznia Wojenna	–	–	–	7,000 tonnes	Option for 5 additional ships of this class as part of the contract.
