= Modernization of the Polish Armed Forces =

Numbers shown near the framework agreements in italics do include equipment ordered in subsequent contracts, envisaged in the framework agreement.

Pre-order proceedings Framework agreement Contract signed / ship in construction Deliveries ongoing Deliveries completed

== Tanks ==
Model	Origin	Type	Image	Variant	Quantity	Details
M1 Abrams	United States	Main battle tank	Polish M1 Abrams	M1A2 SEPv3	250	$4.75 billion contract signed on 5 April 2022; deliveries 2025–2026.
M1 Abrams	United States	Main battle tank	Polish M1 Abrams	M1A1 FEP	116	Refurbished ex-USMC tanks. $1.4 billion (incl. $200 million US aid) contract signed on 4 January 2023; deliveries 2023–2024. 69 delivered by March 2024.
K2 Black Panther	Republic of Korea	Main battle tank		K2/ K2PL	1000	Wilk Programme; Framework agreement signed on 27 July 2022. 820 vehicles to be produced in Poland in modified version K2PL with heavier armour and active protection system.
K2 Black Panther	Republic of Korea	Main battle tank		K2	180	Wilk Programme $3.34 billion contract signed on 26 August 2022; deliveries 2022–2025. 28 delivered by June 2023. Upgrade to K2PL version planned after 2026. 46 delivered by March 2024.

== Artillery ==
Model	Origin	Type	Image	Variant	Quantity	Details
M142 HIMARS	United States	Multiple rocket launcher			20	Homar Programme $414 million contract signed on 13 February 2019; deliveries in 2023. Launchers in US configuration, later to be equipped with Polish C3ISTAR fire control system ZZKO Topaz and Jelcz chassis. 18 delivered by November 2023.
M142 HIMARS	United States	Multiple rocket launcher			486	Homar Programme; 486 Launcher-Loader Module Kits (initially 18 complete launchers on Oshkosh chassis planned together with 468 to be installed on Polish-made Jelcz chassis) for up to $10 billion; potential deal approved by US Congress on 23 February 2023. Framework agreement signed on 11 September 2023. First batch of 126 launchers to be built in the US, second batch of 360 launchers to be built in Poland together with selected rockets (most likely GMLRS 227mm rockets). All 486 launchers on Jelcz chassis.
K239 Chunmoo	Republic of Korea	Multiple rocket launcher	K239PL MSPO24 1		288	Homar Programme; Framework agreement signed on 19 October 2022; deliveries 2023–2028. All launchers will be equipped with Polish C3ISTAR fire control system ZZKO Topaz and Jelcz chassis.
K239 Chunmoo	Republic of Korea	Multiple rocket launcher	K239PL MSPO24 1		218	Homar Programme $3.55 billion contract signed on 4 November 2022; deliveries 2023–2027.
K239 Chunmoo	Republic of Korea	Multiple rocket launcher	K239PL MSPO24 1		72	Homar Programme $1.6 billion contract signed on 25 April 2024; deliveries 2026–2029.
AHS Krab	Poland	Self-propelled howitzer			24	Deliveries completed in August 2017.
AHS Krab	Poland	Self-propelled howitzer			96	PLN 4.649 billion contract signed on 14 December 2016. 56 howitzers delivered 2019–2021; 30 guns to be delivered 2025–2027 (delay due to priority given to the Ukrainian order).
AHS Krab	Poland	Self-propelled howitzer			48	PLN 3.81 billion contract signed on 5 September 2022; deliveries 2025–2027.
AHS Krab	Poland	Self-propelled howitzer			54-72 howitzers donated to Ukraine in 2022.	
AHS Krab	Poland	Self-propelled howitzer			152	Framework agreement signed on 8 December 2023.
K9 Thunder	Republic of Korea	Self-propelled howitzer	A Polish K9 howitzer maneuvers on the firing range for a live fire demonstration	K9A1/K9PL	672	Framework agreement signed on 27 July 2022. Deliveries to commence in 2024; production in Poland to start in 2026.
K9 Thunder	Republic of Korea	Self-propelled howitzer	A Polish K9 howitzer maneuvers on the firing range for a live fire demonstration	K9A1	212	$2.4 billion contract signed on 26 August 2022. Deliveries 2022–2026. All howitzers will be equipped with Polish communications systems and C3ISTAR fire control system ZZKO Topaz 66 delivered by December 2023. Deliveries finished in December 2025.
K9 Thunder	Republic of Korea	Self-propelled howitzer	A Polish K9 howitzer maneuvers on the firing range for a live fire demonstration	K9A1	6	$2.6 billion contract signed on 1 December 2023. Deliveries 2025–2027. Last 6 K9A1s delivered in November 2025.
K9 Thunder	Republic of Korea	Self-propelled howitzer	A Polish K9 howitzer maneuvers on the firing range for a live fire demonstration	K9PL	146	$2.6 billion contract signed on 1 December 2023. Deliveries 2025–2027. Last 6 K9A1s delivered in November 2025.
M120 Rak	Poland	Self-propelled mortar		M120K	64	PLN 968.3 million contract signed on 28 April 2016. Delivered 2017–2019.
M120 Rak	Poland	Self-propelled mortar		M120K	18	PLN 275.5 million contract signed on 11 October 2019. Delivered 2020–2021.
M120 Rak	Poland	Self-propelled mortar		M120K	40	PLN 703.1 million contract signed on 22 May 2020. Deliveries 2022–2024.

== Other vehicles ==
Model	Origin	Type	Image	Variant	Quantity	Details
Borsuk	Poland	Infantry fighting vehicle			1400 (incl. specialized variants)	Framework agreement signed on 28 February 2023. The vehicle in trials as of July 2023. Deliveries planned 2024–2035.
Heavy Infantry Fighting Vehicle	Poland	Infantry fighting vehicle			700 (incl. specialized variants)	Infantry fighting vehicle using AHS Krab/K9 Thunder chassis and ZSSW-30 remotely controlled turret developed for KTO Rosomak and Borsuk IFV. Designed to be non-amphibious but better armoured than Borsuk IFV. Framework agreement signed on 14 August 2023; first deliveries planned in 2025.
KTO Rosomak	Poland	Infantry fighting vehicle	Polish army conducts live-fire training 180613-Z-CN767-067	Rosomak	128	KTO Rosomak integrated with Remotely Controlled Turret System ZSSW-30. The value of the contract is nearly 2.6 billion PLN. The deliveries will be made in 2026 and 2027.
KTO Rosomak	Poland	Infantry fighting vehicle	Rosomak MLU 152442ret	Rosomak-L	80	PLN 4.3 billion contract signed on December 17, 2024. Deliveries 2027 to 2028.
Serwal	Poland	Armoured personnel carrier			a few hundred	New wheeled armoured personnel carrier to be designed by the Polish Armaments Group to supplement and then to replace KTO Rosomak. The vehicle will use ZSSW-30 remotely controlled turret. Framework agreement signed on 14 August 2023; deliveries 2028–2035.
Heron	Poland Czech Republic	Command vehicle	HSW Heron 20240903	Heron 6x6	Unknown	PLN 1.3 billion deal was signed on November 8, 2024. To be delivered in 2027 and 2028.
Waran	Poland Czech Republic	Command vehicle	Waran HSW MSPO22	Waran 4x4	Unknown	PLN 1.3 billion deal was signed on November 8, 2024. To be delivered in 2027 and 2028.
Ottokar Brzoza	Poland; Czech Republic	Tank destroyer		Ottokar Brzoza	Unknown	Close to 20 billion PLN framework agreement was signed on July 20, 2022.
AMZ Bóbr-3	Poland	Scout car	AMZ Bóbr-3 at the training ground of the 1st Warsaw Armoured Brigade.	AMZ Bóbr-3	300	Framework agreement signed on 28 February 2024; deliveries 2025 to 2035.
Cougar	United States	MRAP		Cougar 4x4	300	$27.5 million contract signed on 8 December 2021
M-ATV	United States	MRAP		M1240A1	45	$7.7 million contract signed in 2015.
M-ATV	United States	MRAP		M1240A1	79	$13.9 million contract signed on 31 July 2023
K151 Raycolt	Republic of Korea	Light utility vehicle	KLTV Legwan MSPO24 1	K153 Legwan Legwan L	400	Modified version of Raycolt KLTV to be produced in Poland by Rosomak S.A.; PLN 1.2 billion framework agreement signed on 14 August 2023; deliveries 2024–2030.
LPU Wirus 4	Poland	Light Strike Vehicle	Transfer of long-range reconnaissance vehicles type "Żmija" to the Polish Armed Forces	LPU Wirus 4	118	PLN 90.7 million contract signed in July 2017. The first batch of 25 vehicles was received on December 7, 2021, and another batch of 35 vehicles was delivered on July 21, 2023. Last 58 delivered on 21 December 2024.
PWA Aero	Poland	High mobility airmobile vehicle	PWA Aero	PWA Aero	80	On December 16, 2018, 55 PWA AERO vehicles were signed. In November 2020, the exercise of the option right was confirmed, thus the ordered number of vehicles increased to 80. The total value of the contract amounts to around PLN 50 million. Deliveries completed on October 31, 2022.
Baobab-K	Poland	Minelayer	Scattered Mining Vehicle (Baobab-K)	Baobab-K	24	PLN 510 million contract signed on 14 June 2023. Deliveries 2026–2028.
Jelcz Jak Tank Transporter	Poland	Armoured heavy equipment transporter		C882.62 8×8	31	In October 2021. Under the contract, 31 sets will be delivered under a guaranteed order, and another 78 were provided for under option law. The value of the guaranteed order is PLN 115.9 million gross, and the price of deliveries under the option right is PLN 271.6 million gross. Deliveries will be made from 2023 to 2026.

== Radiolocation and reconnaissance ==
Model	Origin	Type	Image	Variant	Quantity	Details
P-18PL	Poland	Radiolocation station	MSPO23 P18PL radar	P-18PL	24	3.1 billion PLN contract signed on December 19, 2023.To be delivered in the years 2027–2035 by Polish defense industry companies grouped in the PGZ-NAREW.
TCOM 74M	United States	Aerostat-mounted early warning and control radar			4	Barbara Programme $960 million contract signed on 22 May 2024; deliveries 2026–2027.
Pléiades Neo	France	Imagery intelligence satellite			2	Obserwator Programme; EUR 575 million contract for two satellites and a ground receiving station in Poland signed on 27 December 2022. Both satellites to be launched until 2027. In addition, from 2023 Poland is receiving access to data from existing Pléiades constellation (Pléiades-1A and Pléiades-1B).

== Air defence ==
Model	Origin	Type	Image	Variant	Quantity	Details
MIM-104 Patriot	United States	High to medium air defense	Warszawa – defilada „Silni w sojuszach” (3)	PAC-3 MSE	2 batteries	Wisła Programme; Phase I: 2 batteries (4 Fire Units – 4 AN/MPQ-65 radars, 16 M903 launchers, PAC-3 MSE missiles) for $4.75 billion; contract signed on 28 March 2018; deliveries started in 2022, to be completed in 2023.
MIM-104 Patriot	United States	High to medium air defense	Warszawa – defilada „Silni w sojuszach” (3)	PAC-3 MSE	6 batteries	Wisła Programme; Phase II: 6 batteries (12 Fire Units – 12 LTAMDS GhostEye radars, 48 M903 launchers, PAC-3 MSE missiles). Three contracts for overall $9.3 billion signed on 5 September 2023. Deliveries 2026–2029.
CAMM	United Kingdom	Short range air defense		CAMM	1 battery	Narew Programme; Small Narew: 2 Fire Units, i.e. 6 iLaunchers on Jelcz chassis, 2 ZDPSR Soła radars, Polish command system and transport vehicles, and a supply of missiles. PLN 1.65 billion contract signed on 14 April 2022. Deliveries completed in 2023.
CAMM	United Kingdom	Short range air defense		CAMM-ER	23 batteries	Narew Programme; 138 iLaunchers on Jelcz chassis with CAMM-ER missiles, Polish-made Sajna fire control radars, P-18PL and PET/PCL radars, Polish command system and transport vehicles. PLN 29.2 billion contract signed on 5 September 2023; deliveries 2027–2035.
PSR-A Pilica	Poland	Short range air defense		Pilica	6 batteries	Pilica Programme; 6 batteries (6 Fire Units – 24 ZUR 23-2SP Jodek-SP guns with double Grom/Piorun launchers, 6 ELM-2106NG radars and support vehicles). PLN 727.7 million contract signed on 24 November 2016. Delivered 2020–2023.
PSR-A Pilica	Poland	Short range air defense		Pilica+/Pilica++	16 batteries	Pilica Programme; Procurement of 16 Pilica+ batteries and upgrade of 6 delivered in 2023 Pilica batteries to Pilica+ standard. Pilica+ upgrade includes CAMM missiles and Bystra AESA radars. Future Pilica++ upgrade will bring airburst rounds for ZUR-23 guns and SKYctrl anti-drone system. Framework agreement signed on 4 October 2022. Subsequent contracts include Bystra radars ordered on 29 March 2023 for PLN 1.1 billion with deliveries 2026–2028; CAMM missiles ordered on 28 April 2023 for GBP 1.9 billion with deliveries 2025–2029 and 16 Pilica+ batteries and upgrade of 6 Pilica batteries to Pilica+ standard ordered on 28 April 2023 for PLN 2.98 billion with deliveries 2025–2029.

== Fixed-wing aircraft ==
Model	Origin	Type	Image	Variant	Quantity	Details
F-35	United States	Multirole fighter	F-35 in Poland in 2020 during an acquisition deal signing ceremony	F-35A	32	Harpia Programme $4.6 billion contract signed on 31 January 2020; deliveries 2024–2030.
FA-50	Republic of Korea	Light combat aircraft		FA-50GF	12	$705 million contract signed on 16 September 2022; deliveries 2023–2025. Later to be upgraded to FA-50PL standard. Deliveries completed in November 2023.
FA-50	Republic of Korea	Light combat aircraft		FA-50PL	36	$2.3 billion contract signed on 16 September 2022; deliveries 2025–2028. The configuration includes Phantom Strike AESA radar.
Saab 340 AEW&C	Sweden	Airborne early warning and control			2	SEK 500 million contract signed on 25 July 2023; deliveries 2023–2025.

== Helicopters ==
Model	Origin	Type	Image	Variant	Quantity	Details
AH-64 Apache	United States	Attack helicopter	MSPO21 AH64 DSC05130 cr	AH-64E	96	Kruk Programme $10 billion contract was signed on 13 August 2024. Deliveries are scheduled for 2028–2032.
UH-60 Black Hawk	United States	Utility helicopter	Polish SOF S-70i Black Hawk	S-70i	4	PLN 683.4 million deal signed on 25 January 2019. Delivered in 2019.
UH-60 Black Hawk	United States	Utility helicopter	Polish SOF S-70i Black Hawk	S-70i	4	PLN 666 million deal signed on 15 December 2021. Deliveries 2023–2024.
UH-60 Black Hawk	United States	Utility helicopter	Polish SOF S-70i Black Hawk	S-70i	Unknown	Procurment procedure commenced on 21 July 2023.
AW101	United Kingdom; Italy	Utility helicopter		ASW/CSAR	4	PLN 1.65 billion deal signed on 26 April 2019. Deliveries until 2023.
AW101	United Kingdom; Italy	Utility helicopter		Medium-lift transport	22	
AW149	United Kingdom; Italy	Utility helicopter	AW149 at Radom Air Show 2023	Medium-lift transport	32	Perkoz Programme; PLN 8.5 billion deal signed on 1 July 2022. Deliveries 2023–2029. First helicopters delivered on 30 October 2023.
TBA		Training helicopter			24	Plans for Initial Market Consultations announced by the Armament Agency on 15 January 2024.

== Unmanned aerial vehicles ==
Model	Origin	Type	Image	Variant	Quantity	Details
Bayraktar TB2	Turkey	Unmanned combat aerial vehicle	PAF Bayraktar TB2 at Radom-2023		24	PLN 1.745 billion contract signed on 24 May 2021. Delivered 2022–2024.
Gladius	Poland	Reconnaissance and strike system			a few hundred	PLN 2 billion contract signed on 6 May 2022.
FlyEye	Poland	Surveillance and reconnaissance UAV		3.0	124	31 sets (4 UAVs each) delivered 2010–2019 for overall PLN 126 million.
FlyEye	Poland	Surveillance and reconnaissance UAV			1600	Framework agreement signed on 5 September 2023. Deliveries until 2035.
FlyEye	Poland	Surveillance and reconnaissance UAV		3.6	28	PLN 57.6 million contract signed on 17 April 2024. Deliveries until the end of 2024.
FlyEye	Poland	Surveillance and reconnaissance UAV		3.6	24	PLN 24 million contract signed on 4 September 2024. Deliveries 2024-2026.
FlyEye	Poland	Surveillance and reconnaissance UAV		3.6	52	PLN 100 million contract signed on 15 November 2024. Deliveries will end by the end of 2024.

== Missiles ==
Model	Origin	Type	Image	Variant	Quantity	Details
KTSSM	Republic of Korea	Tactical ballistic missile		KTSSM-II (CTM290)	Unknown	Range 290 km. Deliveries 2023–2027; together with the first batch of K239 Chunmoo.
KTSSM	Republic of Korea	Tactical ballistic missile		KTSSM-II (CTM290)	Unknown	Range 290 km. Deliveries 2026–2029; together with the second batch of K239 Chunmoo.
Naval Strike Missile	Norway	Anti-ship/land attack cruise missile			12	PLN 420.9 million contract signed on 30 December 2008. 12 missiles with equipment (Polish-made vehicles and radars) for a coastal missile unit. Deliveries completed in 2013.
Naval Strike Missile	Norway	Anti-ship/land attack cruise missile			38	PLN 492 million contract signed on 28 December 2011. Delivered 2013–2015.
Naval Strike Missile	Norway	Anti-ship/land attack cruise missile			24	PLN 800 million contract signed on 14 July 2014. 24 missiles with equipment for a coastal missile unit. Delivered 2017–2018.
Naval Strike Missile	Norway	Anti-ship/land attack cruise missile			Unknown	PLN 8 billion contract signed on 5 September 2023. Equipment for two coastal missile units and unspecified quantity of missiles. Deliveries 2026–2032.
AGM-88 HARM	United States	Air-to-surface anti-radiation missile		AGM-88G AARGM-ER	360	Up to $1.275 billion potential deal approved by US Department of State on 24 April 2024.
AGM-114 Hellfire	United States	Anti-tank guided missile		AGM-114R2 Hellfire II (Hellfire Romeo)	800	$150 million contract signed on 30 May 2023. Deliveries until 2029.
FGM-148 Javelin	United States	Anti-tank guided missile	Pierwsze strzelanie WOT z systemu JAVELIN	FGM-148F	180	$54.5 million contract signed on 13 May 2020. Delivered 2017–2022.
FGM-148 Javelin	United States	Anti-tank guided missile	Pierwsze strzelanie WOT z systemu JAVELIN	FGM-148F	500	$103.5 million contract signed on 31 January 2023. Deliveries until 2026.
Spike	Israel	Anti-tank guided missile			2675	Contract signed in 2003. Delivered 2004–2013.
Spike	Israel	Anti-tank guided missile			1000	Contract signed on 17 December 2015. Delivered 2017–2022.
Spike	Israel	Anti-tank guided missile		Spike-LR Dual	500–600 (estimated)	PLN 400 million contract signed on 3 August 2023. Deliveries 2023–2026. Licence-built by Mesko with Polish industrial participation estimated at 70%.
Carl Gustaf	Sweden	recoilless rifle	Carl Gustav M4 Kokonaisturvallisuus 2015 (cropped)	Carl Gustaf M4	6000	PLN 6.5 billion contract signed on 4 March 2024. Deliveries 2024-2027.

== Navy ==
Model	Origin	Type	Image	Variant	Quantity	Details
Orka class	Sweden	Attack submarine			3	Orka Programme; Initial Market Consultations commenced on 14 July 2023. Procurement procedure planned to start before the end of 2023. Earlier procedure dated back to 2014 has been cancelled. In 2017, there were ongoing talks with Naval Group (offering Scorpène-class submarine, pictured), ThyssenKrupp Marine Systems (Type 212CD) and Saab Kockums (Blekinge-class).
Miecznik class	United Kingdom; Poland	Air defence frigate			3	Miecznik Programme; Contract signed on 27 July 2021 with PLN 14.8 billion overall cost as of 15 December 2023. Ships based on Babcock International's Type 31 frigate project to be built in Poland by consortium led by Polish Armaments Group. ORP Wicher laid down on 31 January 2024 with commission planned in 2029. ORP Burza and ORP Huragan to be commissioned in 2030 and 2031, respectively.
Kormoran II class	Poland	Minehunter			3	First vessel, ORP Kormoran, ordered on 23 September 2013 for PLN 700 million and commissioned on 28 November 2017. Another 2 ships ordered in December 2017 for PLN 1.4 billion. ORP Albatros commissioned on 28 November 2022, ORP Mewa commissioned on 14 February 2023
Kormoran II class	Poland	Minehunter			3	PLN 2.5 million contract signed on 26 June 2022. The ships slated to enter service 2026–2027. ORP Jaskółka laid down on 25 July 2023, ORP Rybitwa laid down on 20 March 2024.
Delfin class	Sweden; Poland	Signals intelligence gathering vessel			2	Delfin Programme; 2 vessels to be designed and built by Saab AB in cooperation with Remontowa Shipbuilding S.A. shipyard in Gdańsk and MMC Ship Design & Marine Consulting Ltd. in Gdynia. €620 million contract signed on 25 November 2022. Both ships to be completed by 2027. ORP Jerzy Różycki laid down on 27 July 2023. ORP Henryk Zygalski laid down on 23 January 2024.

== Personal equipment ==
Model	Origin	Type	Image	Variant	Quantity	Details
Wz. 2005	Poland	Combat helmet			60,000	Delivered 2017 to 2019.
Wz. 2005	Poland	Combat helmet			52,000	53.5 million PLN contract signed on 8 March 2023. Deliveries 2023 to 2024.
Wz. 2005	Poland	Combat helmet			Introduced in 2006. At least 42,000 supplied to Ukraine in 2022.	
HP-05	Poland	Combat helmet			50,000	Delivered 2020 to 2023.
HP-05	Poland	Combat helmet			42,000	80.9 million PLN contract signed on 8 March 2023. Deliveries 2024 to 2025.
HP-05	Poland	Combat helmet			10,000	20 million PLN contract signed on 7 May 2024. Deliveries until 2024.
HP-05	Poland	Combat helmet			10,000	20 million PLN contract signed on 24 October 2024. Deliveries until 2024.
HBT-02	Poland	Combat helmet			Unknown	Qualification tests completed . First deliveries planned in 2025.
Lampart	Poland	Combat uniform			Unknown	Szpej Programme Currently used by 5th Podhale Rifle Battalion of 18th Mechanized Division for testing purposes. Will replace wz.1993 Pantera.

== Firearms ==
Model	Origin	Type	Image	Variant	Quantity	Details
FB VIS 100	Poland	Semi-automatic pistol	VIS 100	VIS 100	48,000	20,000 delivered. Additional 28,000 ordered in May 2023.
FB MSBS Grot	Poland	Assault rifle	Karabinek Grot (MSBS)	MSBS-R MSBS C16 FB-M0 MSBS C16 FB-M1 MSBS C16 FB-M2	184,000	
Grot 762N	Poland	Designated marksman rifle		MSBS Grot 762N	250	The delivery will start in 2024.
