= OSU-35K =

Polish anti-aircraft gun

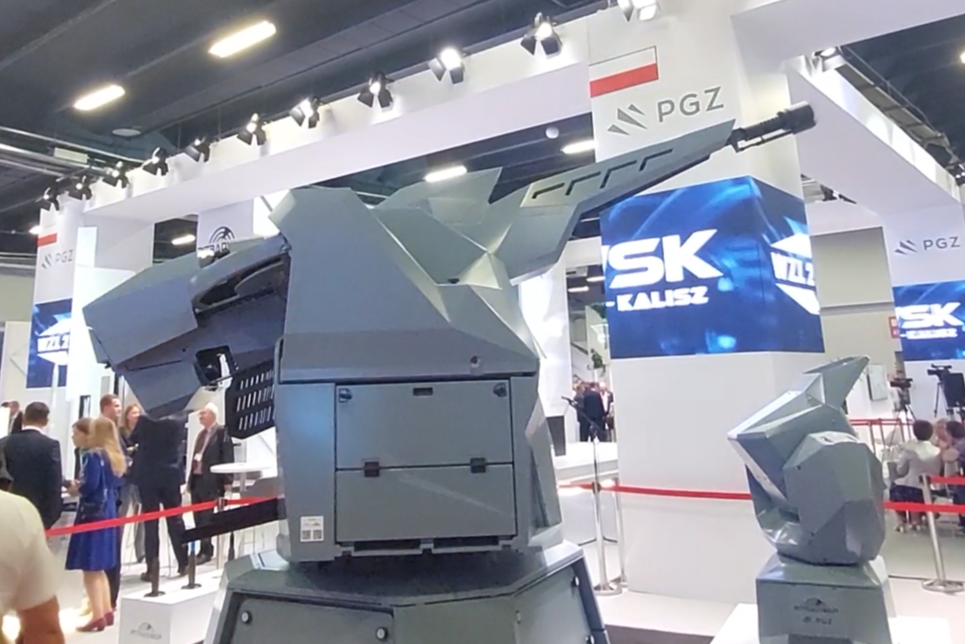
- OSU-35K system displayed at MSPO 2023 defense expo
- Type: Close-in weapon system
- Place of origin: Poland

Service history
- In service: 2022-present
- Used by: Polish Navy

Production history
- Designer: Military University of Technology
- Designed: 2012
- Manufacturer: PIT-Radwar
- No. built: 5

Specifications
- Mass: 3300 kg (without ammunition)
- Length: 4.85 m
- Height: 2.62 m (overall); 1.97 m (turret)
- Crew: Unmanned
- Shell: FAPDS-T; ABM; TP-T
- Caliber: 35×228mm
- Barrels: 1
- Action: Gas-operated
- Elevation: −10° / +85°
- Traverse: 360° (unlimited)
- Rate of fire: 550 rpm
- Effective firing range: 3000-5000 m
- Feed system: Dual feed, 2×100 rounds belt

The OSU-35K (Polish: Okrętowy System Uzbrojenia 35 mm - 35 mm Naval Weapon System) is a Polish naval remote weapon station and a close-in weapon system manufactured by PIT-Radwar. Armed with a 35 mm Oerlikon KDA autocannon, it is meant to defend surface combatants against various types of maneuvering aerial targets such as anti-ship missiles, unmanned aerial vehicles, conventional and rotary-wing aircraft, It can also engage surface and coastal targets. It is in service with the Polish Navy on the Kormoran II-class (Project 258) minehunters and is planned to equip the Wicher-class (Project 106) frigates.

== Development ==
The development of the OSU-35K began in 2012 when the Naval High Command submitted a proposal to develop a naval weapon system armed with the KDA autocannon to the National Centre for Research and Development (NCBR). On December 19, 2012, NCBR signed an agreement with the consortium consisting of the Military University of Technology (leader), Polish Naval Academy, Bumar Elektronika S.A. (currently PIT-Radwar S.A.) and ZM Tarnów S.A. First, a prototype version of the system, named OSU-35 was to be developed and tested. The results of the prototype's trials and the experiences gained during its development would serve as a basis for designing a new, production variant of the system, the OSU-35K.

In 2013, the first renders of the OSU-35 were unveiled, showing a conventional design with the gun mounted in a fully enclosed, angular turret. The OSU-35 system consists of four major components: the AM-35 (Armata Morska - Naval Cannon) gun-turret armed with the KDA autocannon, the ZGS-158M (Zintegrowana Głowica Śledząca - Integrated Tracking Head) optical sight fitted, the main fire control station and the emergency fire control station.

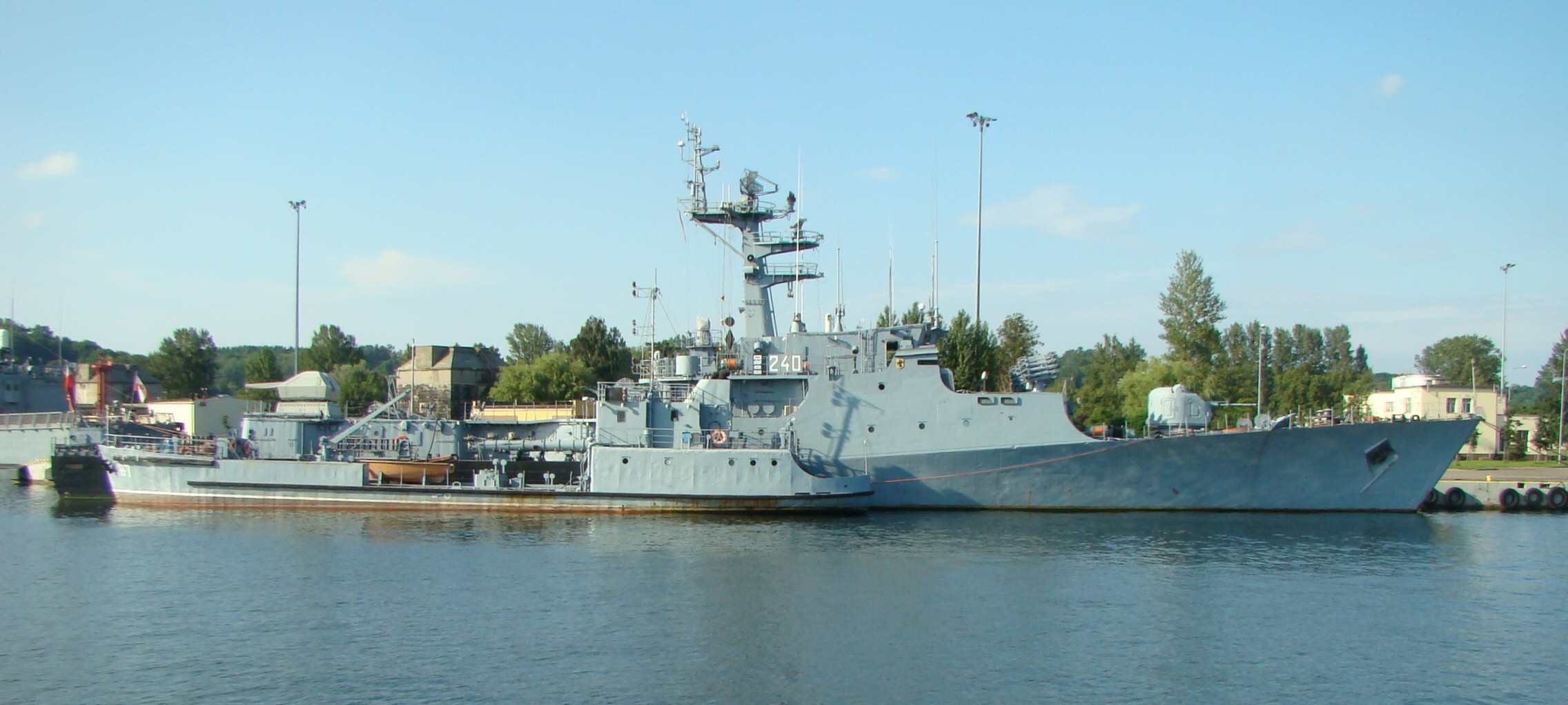
ORP Kaszub corvette with the OSU-35 system in the Gdynia Naval Base, 2017

The prototype of the OSU-35 underwent trials at the end of 2015 at the Central Air Force Training Ground in Ustka, after which, in May 2016, it was mounted on the ORP Kaszub ASW corvette for the sea trials. The AM-35 turret was fitted on the superstructure, replacing the stern ZU-23-2M Wróbel double 23 mm gun mount, while the ZGS-158M sight was mounted amidships just behind the radar mast. The trials lasted two years and ended on July 21, 2018, when the OSU-35 was formally accepted into service.

The experiences gained during the design and testing of the OSU-35 allowed to start developing a new version of the system named OSU-35K. This variant was to be lighter and more compact as it was meant to be optimized for mounting on the Kormoran II-class minehunters (hence the name). The design of the turret was changed to an open one, with a layout more similar to the MLG 27 or Mk 38. First renders of the system appeared in 2020, with a more detailed model being shown at the MSPO 2021 expo. The prototype of the system was tested on the Mesko's proving ground in Skarżysko-Kamienna in the summer of 2022.

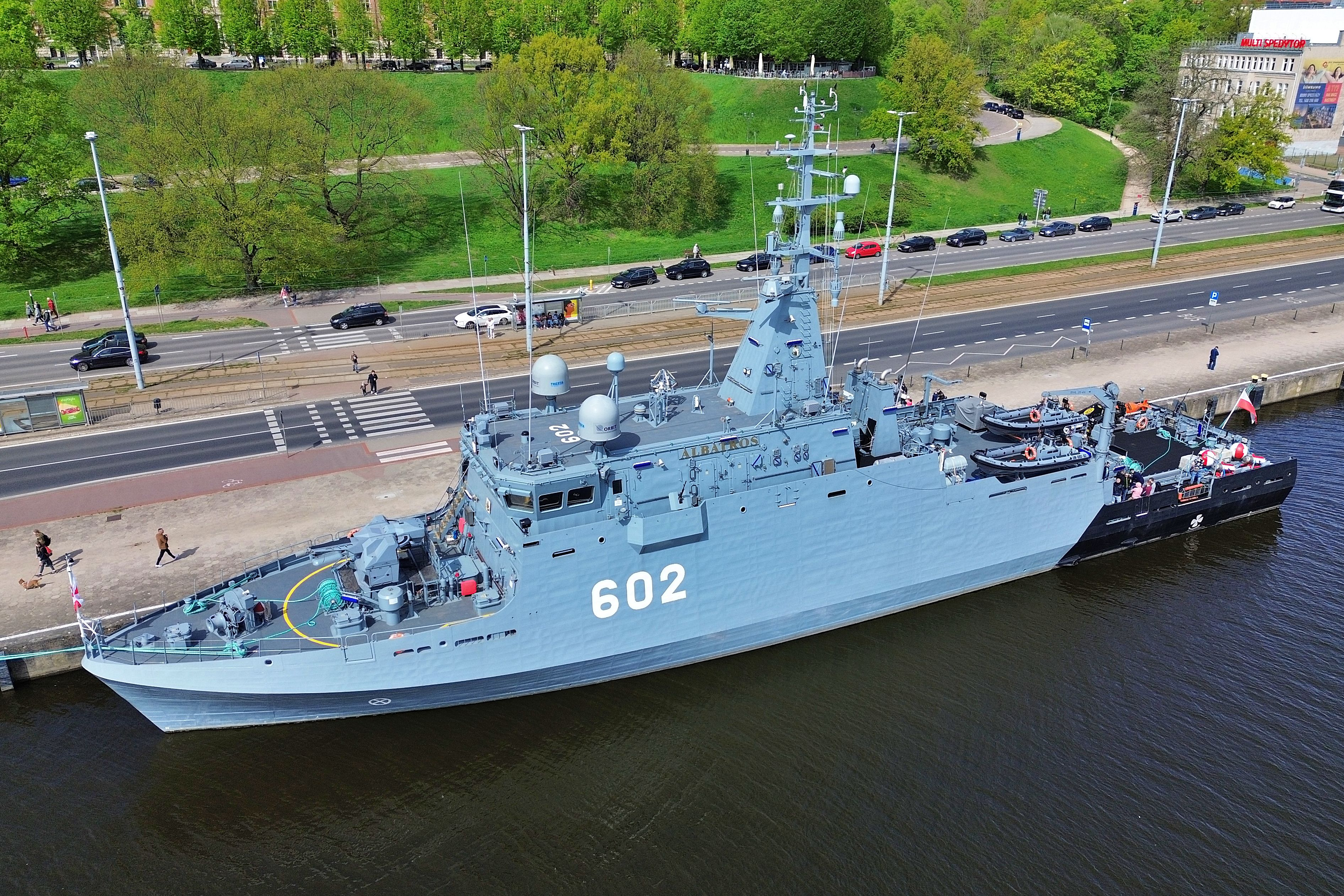
ORP Albatros minehunter fitted with the OSU-35K system in Szczecin, 2024

On September 19, 2022, Polish Armament Group (PGZ) announced that two of its divisions, PIT-Radwar and PGZ Naval Shipyard, signed a contract for the delivery of three OSU-35K systems for the first three Project 258 minehunters - ORP Kormoran (601), ORP Albatros (602) and ORP Mewa (603). On November 12, 2022, the AM-35K turret was mounted on the ORP Mewa minehunter to test the interchangeability of the systems between different ships of the class. The first ship to be fully integrated with the OSU-35K was the ORP Albatros, which received the system at the end of November. In mid 2023, the prototype of the system completed sea trials on board of the ORP Albatros, after which the OSU-35K was officially accepted into service in September. Later in 2023, the prototype of the OSU-35K was removed from the Albatros and returned to PIT-Radwar.

At MSPO 2024, PIT-Radwar presented a technology demonstrator of the Tuga X-band AESA radar. With the detection range of up to 50 km, Tuga is meant to be used as a sensor for the VSHORAD and CIWS systems, such as the OSU-35K. It can be used individually, or integrated into a hybrid, radar-optical sensor. During this expo, a prototype of a land-based SA-35 anti-air system was presented as well. It consists of the OSU-35K system (most likely the prototype, taken from the ORP Albatros) mounted on the Jelcz 663.45 6×6 truck and is meant to provide point defense for stationary targets such as critical infrastructure, cities or air defense missile batteries.

On January 30, 2026, an order for delivery of 18 SA-35 systems was placed as a part of a bigger contract for 18 batteries of the San VSHORAD system. All of the systems are to be delivered by 2028.

The OSU-35K system was once again installed on the ORP Albatros on July 28, 2026 at PGZ Naval Shipyard in Gdynia, this time in what appears to be the serial production variant, with the turret differing slightly from the two prototypes seen before.

== Description ==
=== Armament ===
The armament of the system in all of its variants is a single 35 mm Oerlikon KDA autocannon produced by HSW under a license obtained in 1995 for the now cancelled Loara SPAAG program. The gun is gas operated, fires at a rate of 550 rpm and is belt-fed from both sides by two 100 rounds ammo racks. The dual feed feature of the KDA autocannon makes it unique among other guns of the KD family as it allows to use two different ammunition types (usually FAPDS and ABM) and switch between them depending on the type of the target, which increases the flexibility of the system when compared to those based on the KDC (such as the Gökdeniz, Korkut or Göker) or the KDG (Millenium, Skynex or MANTIS).

==== AM-35 ====
The AM-35 (Armata Morska 35 mm - 35mm Naval Cannon) turret is visually similar to that of the Oerlikon Millenium system, with the gun being placed centrally in an enclosed, angular housing. The ammunition is stored in two vertically placed drums (each fitted with a braking mechanism to control the feed rate) located in the front of the turret, and fed via rigid and then flexible feed chutes. The spent cases are ejected forward, through a chute under the gun. The turret has a traverse range of 175° to each side depending on the ship it's mounted on (on the ORP Kaszub it was 130° to each side), and the gun's elevation angles are -10° to +80°. The rate of traverse and elevation is 2 rad/s (~114 deg/s), with the acceleration of 2 rad/s². An emergency optical sight is mounted on the gun, which enables the turret to track targets independently, in case of the main sight being damaged. The turret system weighs about 4.3 tonnes, is 2.93 meters long (without the barrel), 2.61 meters wide, 1,76 meters tall above deck (2,47 including deck penetration) and the turret ring diameter is 2,12 meters.

==== AM-35K ====
The AM-35K is a much different design, more akin to remote control weapon stations mounted on armored vehicles. The turret is more open, made mostly out of carbon fiber. The gun is mounted externally and covered with a shroud to protect it from the adverse weather conditions. Two ammunition boxes are placed at the base of the turret, from which the ammunition is fed via flexible and then rigid feed chutes. The flexible chutes are protected against elements by composite covers to prevent feeding issues. Spent casings are ejected downwards from the gun, behind the turret mounting. The AM-35K turret weighs about 3.3 tonnes without ammunition, can traverse freely and the gun can be elevated from -10° to +85°, The gun shroud is fitted with a 3.2 Mpix (1920×1080) camera meant for engaging targets from the emergency fire control station in case of the main sight or the ship's CMS being disabled. The two pre-production turrets differ from the production batch mainly cosmetically, with the most visible changes being a shorter barrel shroud on the production batch and a different geometry of the feed chute covers.

=== Sensors ===
==== ZGS-158M ====
The sighting system of the OSU-35, the ZGS-158M (Zintegrowana Głowica Śledząca - Integrated Tracking Head), is based on the one used in the WD-95 command and fire control vehicle used in the Navy's 57mm land-based air defense batteries of the Blenda system, and it consists of a daytime and thermal cameras as well as a laser rangefinder (with 20 Hz ranging rate) and an IKZ-02 IFF system. The sight is mounted independently of the turret to eliminate the vibrations caused by the firing. The sight weighs about 350 kg has unlimited horizontal traverse and elevation angles of -10° to +85°, and the rate of both traverse and elevation is 3 rad/s (~172 deg/s), with the acceleration of 4.5 rad/s² (~258 deg/s²).

==== ZGS-35K ====
The ZGS-35K sight is made mostly out of carbon fiber and consists of a daytime and thermal cameras as well as a laser rangefinder and an IKZ-50P IFF system. The laser rangefinder has a maximum range of 30 km and a ranging rate of 30 Hz, which allows the system to accurately engage fast moving targets with programmable ammunition. The daylight camera operates in the 350-700 nm wavelength spectrum and has a detection range of 25 km against a 2.3 × 2.3 m target, while the thermal camera has an wavelength spectrum of 3.5 μm and can detect the same sized target at a distance of 15 km. The sight has unlimited horizontal traverse, elevation angles of -10° to +85° and weighs 145 kg.

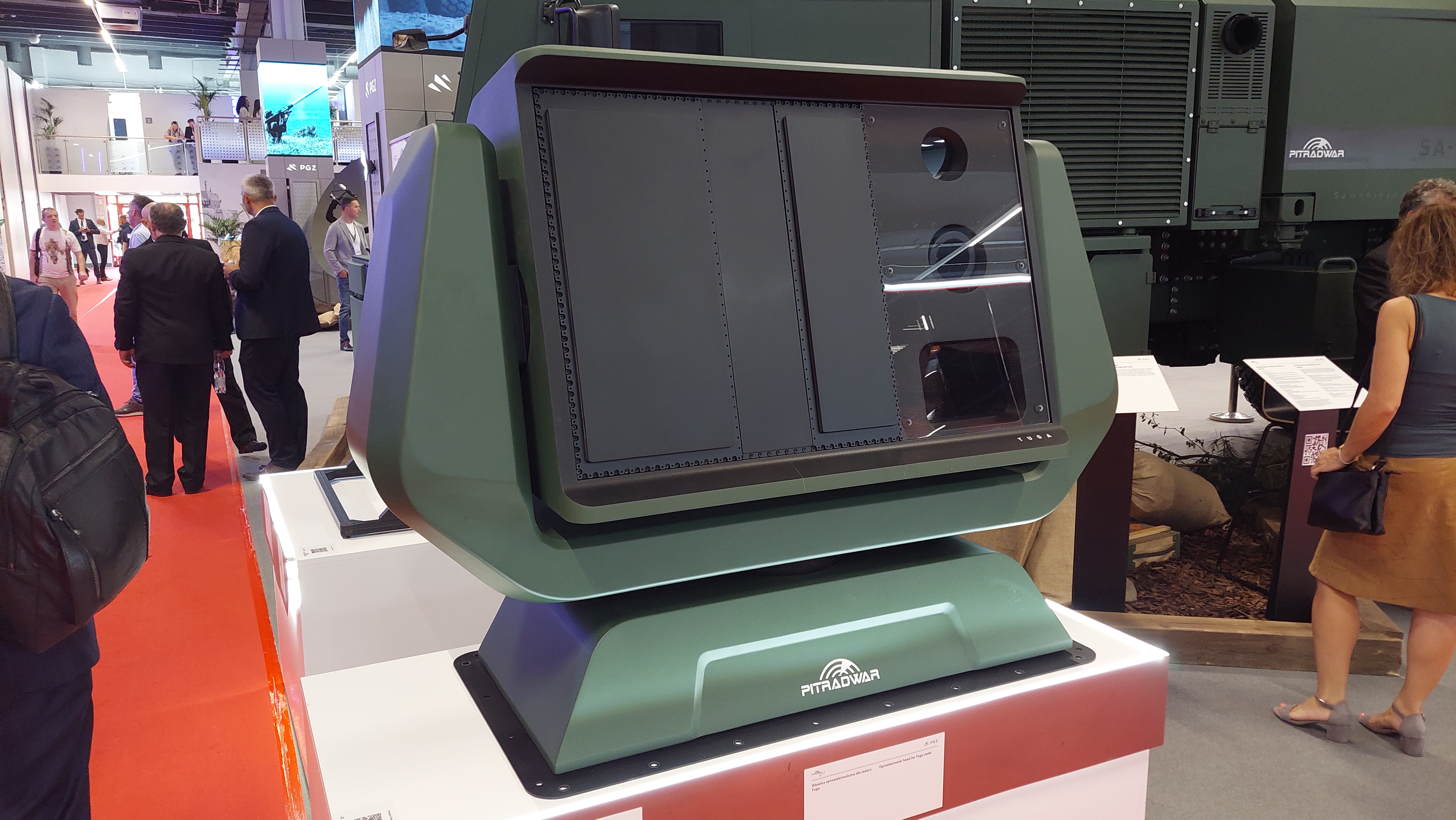
Prototype of the Tuga radar integrated with optical sights and a laser rangefinder, MSPO 2024.

==== Tuga radar ====
One of the intended roles of the Tuga radar is to be integrated with the optical sensors of the OSU-35K and serve as the system's fire control radar. The radar incorporates GaN technology and operates in the X-band. Its detection range is up to 50 km, with small targets (Micro UAVs, with RCS of 0,01 m^{2}) being detected at up to 5 km. Thanks to the AESA technology, a single antenna has a coverage of 90° in azimuth and 33° in elevation.

=== Ammunition ===
There are three types of ammunition used by the OSU-35 and OSU-35K systems - FAPDS-T and TP-T and ABM, known under the name SAP-35 (System Amunicji Programowalnej 35 mm - 35 mm Programmable Ammunition System). Both FAPDS and TP rounds were developed in the end of the 20th century for the Loara program before its cancellation. The FAPDS ammunition allows the system to engage targets at longer ranges (up to 5.5 km compared to 3.5–4 km of range for most 35 mm ABM rounds) as well as to engage fast moving targets more easily thanks to the greater velocity of the projectile. The development of the airburst ammunition started somewhere in the 2nd decade of the 21st century in relation to the San and Noteć programs meant to replace the Navy's 57mm land-based air defense systems. The ammunition passed factory trials in 2019, and on December 12, 2022, NCBR and the consortium consisting of the Military University of Technology (leader), PIT-Radwar S.A. and Mesko S.A. signed an agreement for testing and implementation of the SAP-35 airburst ammunition. The ammunition is to be ready for serial production and service by mid 2025.

The SAP-35 ammunition is similar to the German AHEAD, in that it is also programmed at the muzzle (by a very similar, cylindrical coil programmer) consists of 152 tungsten subprojectiles, each weighing around 3.3 grams, that are released at a predetermined distance. Together with a high-frequency laser rangefinder, the programmable ammunition allows the system to engage fast moving and maneuvering targets at ranges up to 3.5 km. The subprojectiles have a penetration of 7 mm RHA directly after the release, which enables SAP-35 to perform C-RAM duties.

Type	Designation	Cartridge weight (g)	Projectile weight (g)	Bursting charge (g)	Muzzle velocity (m/s)	Effective range (m)	Penetration (mm RHA at 60° at 1 km)
FAPDS-T	-	1460	380	-	1440	5500	N/A
ABM	SAP-35	1850	750	N/A	1050	3500	-
TP-T	-	1588	550	-	1180	3000	-

== Deployment ==
The OSU-35 system has been fitted on the ORP Kaszub corvette for trials in May 2016. After passing the trials, the system was formally adopted into service in 2018, and then removed from the ship during its renovation in 2022. During the exercises of the Combat Ship Squadron in October 2024, the system was again spotted on board the ORP Kaszub.

The OSU-35K is the main anti-air armament of the Kormoran II-class, except of the first ship of the class, the ORP Kormoran, which is armed with the ZU-23-2MR Wróbel-II since the OSU-35K was still in early development during its commissioning. The ORP Kormoran will receive the OSU-35K system in the near future.

== Versions ==
=== OSU-35 ===
The initial prototype version of the system, consisting of four main parts: the AM-35 gun-turret, the ZGS-158M sight, the main fire control station and the emergency fire control station, a pedestal mount with a yoke to control the gun, an anti-air sight and an intercom to communicate with the main fire control station. The main fire control station consists of the fire control computer, a control stick to operate the turret in the manual mode as well as two displays - one for the radar data and the other one for the image from the ZGS-158M sight. The system can operate as a part of the ship's combat management system or independently, like on the ORP Kaszub which doesn't have a digital CMS.

=== OSU-35K ===
The newest variant of the system. It has four main subcomponents: the AM-35K turret, the ZGS-35K optical sight, the BSKO-35K (Blok Systemu Kierowania Ogniem - Fire Control System Block) fire control system and the RSKO-35K (Rezerwowe Stanowisko Kierowania Ogniem) emergency fire control station. The fire control system is meant to be integrated with the ship's CMS and allows the OSU-35K to be operated manually as well as operate automatically and semi-automatically. The emergency fire control station has a form of a console with a display and a control stick, and is used to operate the AM-35K turret in case of the main FCS or the ship's CMS being damaged. On the Project 258 minehunters, the RSKO-35K console is mounted on the ship's bridge, which allows the operator to visually identify the targets for the bow-mounted AM-35K turret.

The pre-production batch of the OSU-35K consists of two systems, one mounted on the ORP Mewa minehunter and one on the Jelcz 663.45 truck as the technology demonstrator of the SA-35 system, while the systems from the second batch are fitted on the ORP Albatros and ORP Jaskółka.

=== OSU-35M ===
Some sources claim that the systems meant for the Wicher-class frigates will be more advanced, with a more capable fire control system. This version will supposedly be called OSU-35M, after the Miecznik program under which the frigates are being procured.

=== SA-35 ===
The SA-35 (Samobieżna Armata 35 mm - 35mm Self-propelled Cannon) is a land-based VSHORAD system with counter rocket, artillery, and mortar (C-RAM) capability, meant to defend stationary targets such as critical infrastructure, cities or SAM batteries. The system is fitted onto a 20 ft container sized platform, with the front of the platform taken up by the power generator and all the necessary electronics (such as the BSKO-35K FCS and the communications equipment) housed in a superstructure on top of which the ZGS-35K sight is mounted, and the AM-35K turret being mounted more on the rear. Using the 20 ft container footprint allows the SA-35 to be mounted on every truck able to transport such containers, and four extendable legs fitted onto the platform enable it to be easily placed on uneven terrain. The turret is controlled from the truck's cabin using the RSKO-35K, which can also be used externally which allows the SA-35 system to be operated from a distance and without the truck.
