= ORP Mewa =

ORP Mewa was the name of at least three ships of the Polish Navy and may refer to:

- ORP Mewa (1935), a Jaskółka-class minesweeper launched in 1935 and sunk in 1939
- ORP Mewa (1966), a Projekt 206 minesweeper/minehunter launched in 1966 and decommissioned in 2019
- ORP Mewa (603), a Kormoran II-class minehunter launched in 2019
