= ORP Kaszub =

ORP Kaszub may refer to one of several ships of the Polish Navy:

- ORP Kaszub (1921), the ex-German torpedo boat, V-108, launched in 1914, transferred to Poland in 1921 and destroyed by a boiler explosion on 20 July 1925.
- ORP Kaszub (1954), a Soviet M-class submarine which served with the Polish Navy from 1954 to 1963.
- ORP Kaszub (1987), a Project 620 corvette launched in 1987 and still in active service. She was the first ocean-going warship built in Poland.
