= ORP Arctowski =

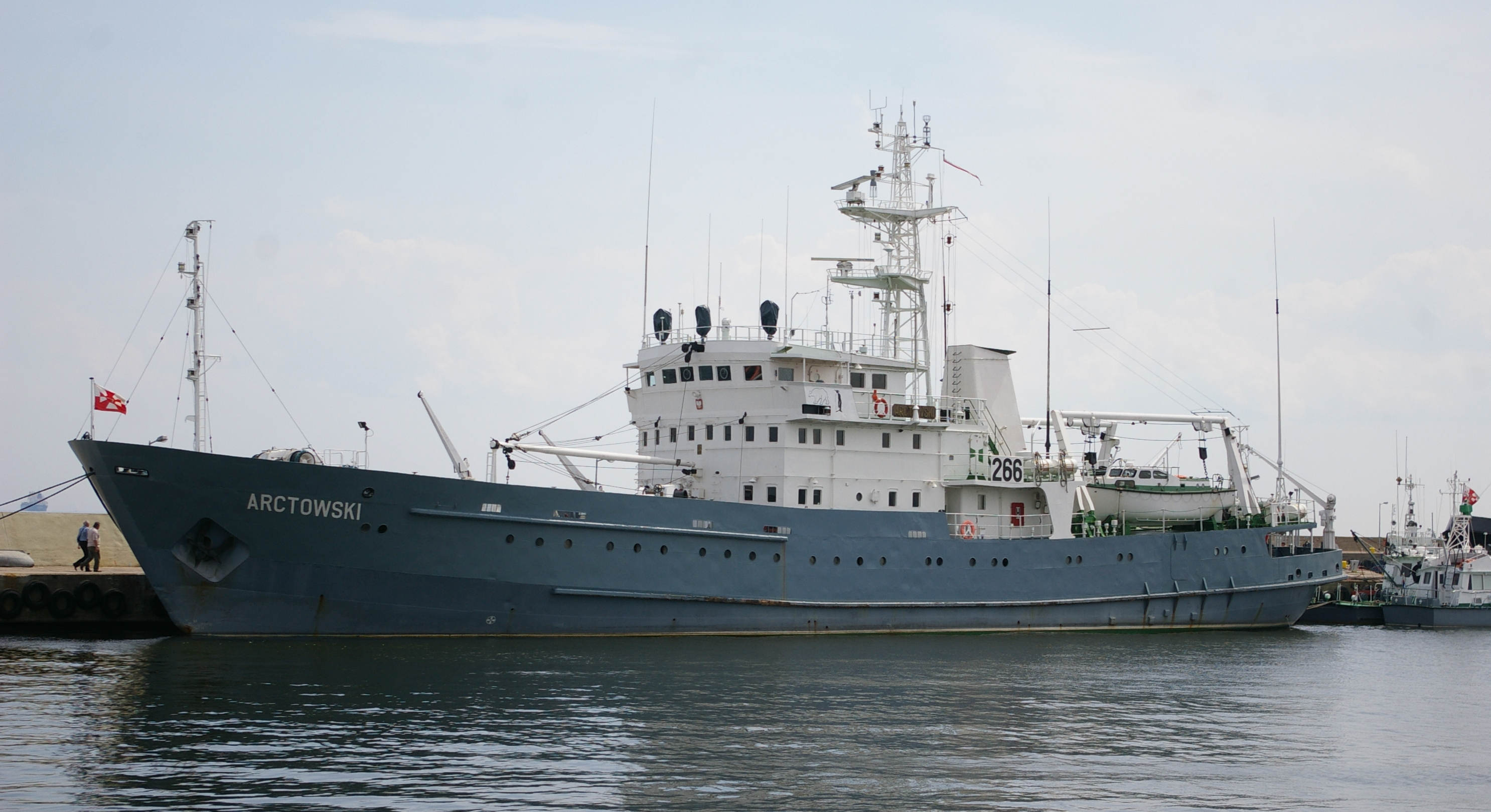
- ORP Arctowski

History

Poland
- Name: ORP Arctowski
- Builder: Northern Shipyard, Gdańsk
- Launched: 20 February 1982
- Commissioned: 27 November 1982
- Identification: MMSI number: 261246000; Callsign: SPWB
- Status: Active as of 2018

General characteristics
- Class & type: Modified Finik class
- Displacement: 1218 tons
- Length: 61.6 m (202 ft 1 in)
- Beam: 10.8 m (35 ft 5 in)
- Draft: 3.3 m (10 ft 10 in)
- Propulsion: 2 engines Cegielski-Sulzer 6AL25/30 diesels, 1920 hp each; 2 auxiliary motors, 204 hp each; 2 shafts; bow thruster
- Speed: 13.7 knots (25.4 km/h; 15.8 mph)
- Complement: 49

ORP Arctowski is a survey ship of the Polish Navy. Launched in 1982 in Poland, she is the lead ship of the Projekt 874 class, known as modified Finik-class in NATO code. She is the sister ship of ORP Heweliusz. She is named after Henryk Arctowski, a Polish scientist and explorer.

In July 2006, the crew of the ship performed the positive identification of the wreckage of the German World War II aircraft carrier Graf Zeppelin.
