= ORP Heweliusz =

Survey ship of the Polish Navy

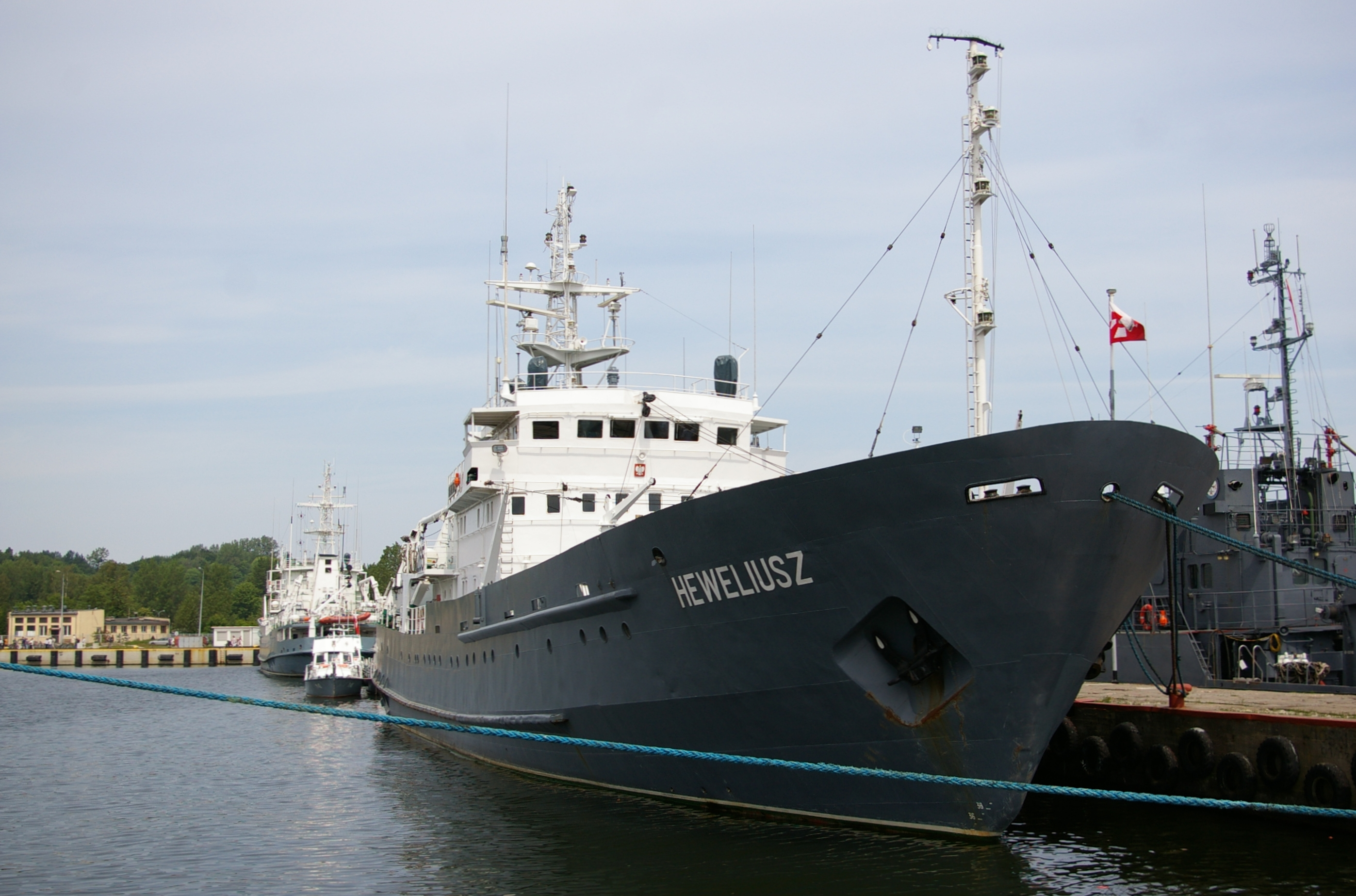

History

Poland
- Name: ORP Heweliusz
- Namesake: Johannes Hevelius
- Builder: Northern Shipyard, Gdańsk
- Laid down: 11 March 1981
- Launched: 11 September 1981
- Commissioned: 27 November 1982
- Identification: MMSI number: 261247000; Callsign: SPWC
- Status: Active as of 2018

General characteristics
- Class & type: Modified Finik class
- Length: 61.6 m (202 ft 1 in)
- Beam: 10.8 m (35 ft 5 in)
- Draft: 3.3 m (10 ft 10 in)
- Propulsion: 2 engines Cegielski-Sulzer 6AL25/30 diesels, 1920 hp each; 2 auxiliary motors, 204 hp each; 2 shafts; bow thruster
- Speed: 13.7 knots (25.4 km/h; 15.8 mph)
- Complement: 49

ORP Heweliusz is a survey ship of the Polish Navy of the Projekt 874 class, known as modified Finik class in NATO code. She was launched on 11 September 1981 and commissioned on 27 November 1982.

The sister ship of ORP Arctowski is named after the astronomer Johannes Hevelius (Polish: Jan Heweliusz).
