= ORP Kaszub (1987) =

Corvette of the Polish Navy

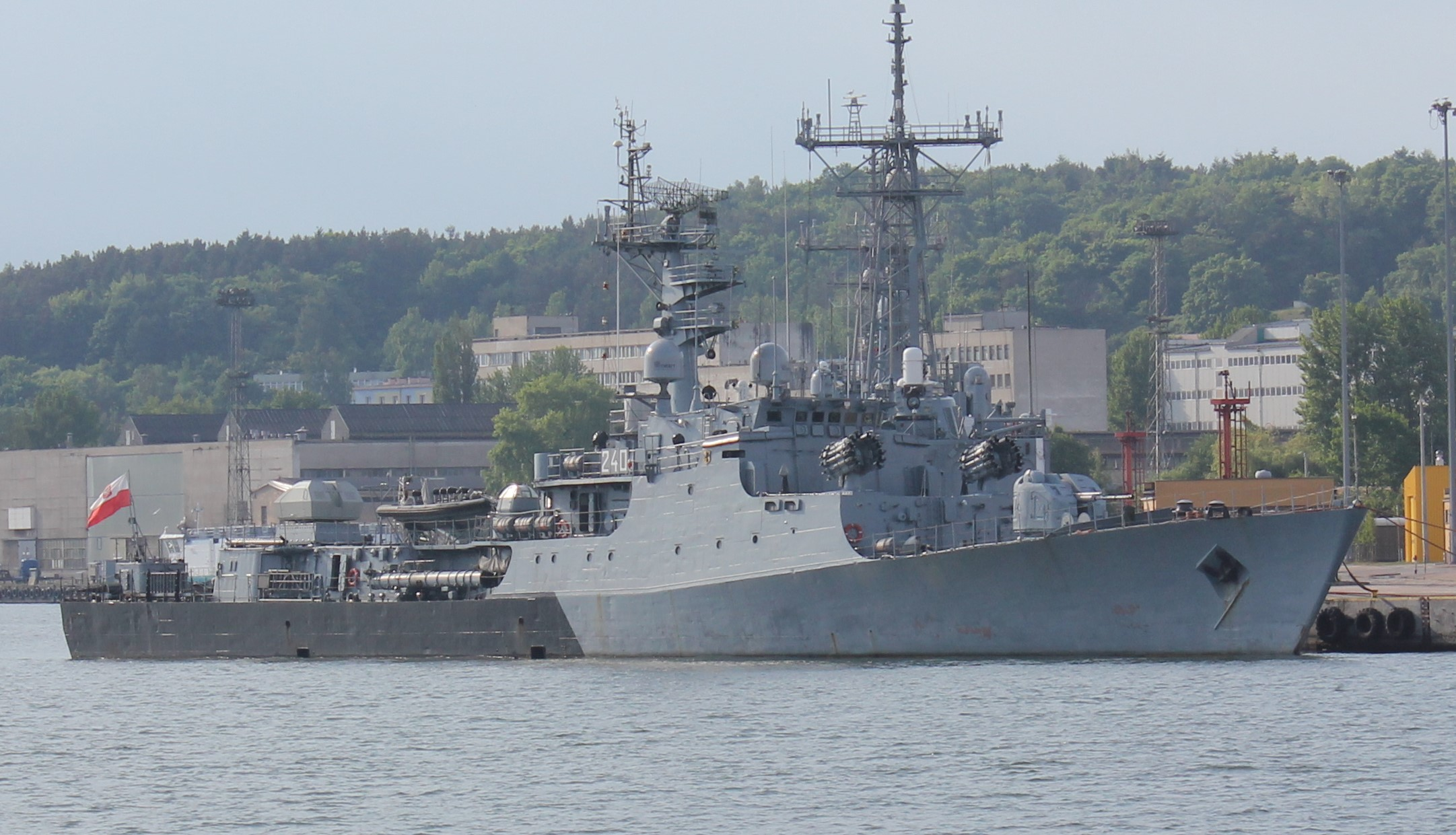
- ORP Kaszub in Gdynia on 26 May 2018

History

Poland
- Name: ORP Kaszub
- Builder: Stocznia Północna, Gdańsk
- Laid down: 9 June 1984
- Launched: 11 May 1986
- Commissioned: 15 March 1987
- Identification: MMSI number: 261227000; Callsign: SNWC
- Status: In active service

General characteristics
- Displacement: 1,051 long tons (1,068 t) standard; 1,183 long tons (1,202 t) full load
- Length: 82.34 m (270 ft 2 in)
- Beam: 10 m (32 ft 10 in)
- Draught: 3.1 m (10 ft 2 in) (hull); 4.9 m (16 ft 1 in) (sonar dome)
- Installed power: 4× Cegieski-Sulzer AS 16V 25/30 diesels; 12.42 MW (16,660 shp) total
- Propulsion: CODAD, 2 shafts
- Speed: 27 kn (31 mph; 50 km/h)
- Range: 3,500 mi (3,000 nmi; 5,600 km) at 14 kn (16 mph; 26 km/h)
- Complement: 67
- Sensors & processing systems: Radar: MR 302 Air/surface search (NATO Strut Curve); Nogat SRN 7453 surface search; SRN 441XT Navigation radar; Sonar: MG 322T hull mounted medium frequency active search; MG 392M high-frequency dipping sonar
- Armament: 1× AK-176 76 mm gun; 1x OSU-35 35 mm CIWS; 2× ZU-23-2M Wróbel 23 mm cannon (2× twin mounts); 2× 9K32M Strela 2M surface-to-air missiles; 4× 533mm (21 in) torpedo tubes (2× twin tubes) for SET-53M torpedoes; 2× RBU-6000 anti-submarine rocket launchers

ORP Kaszub is a corvette of the Polish Navy, in service since 1987, the sole ship of the Project 620 class. She was the first ocean-going warship built in Poland. As of 2012 she is in active service.

== Construction and career ==
The work on her design began in 1971, but the construction of the first ship started only in 1984, being laid down at Stocznia Północna (Northern Shipyard), Gdańsk on 9 June 1984. Kaszub was launched on 11 May 1986, but was found to have a warped hull and propeller shafts, which required repair. When the ship was commissioned on 15 March 1987, Kaszub was not fitted with much of the planned armament, with a 9K33 Osa (NATO codename SA-N-4 Gecko) surface-to-air missile launcher being omitted because of its unreliability on small, high speed ships, while the ship's main gun armament was absent because of stability problems. Originally it was planned to build 7 ships of this class, but in the end only one was constructed.

At first, Kaszub saw little operational use, being loaned to the Polish Border guard from 1990 to January 1991. In September 1991, the ship was fitted with an AK-176 76 mm (3.0 in) gun turret forward.

In October 2016, the OSU-35 CIWS was mounted on the ship for sea trials. The system passed the tests and was officially certified on December 19, 2018.
