= Kormoran 2-class minehunter =

Class of Polish mine hunting vessels

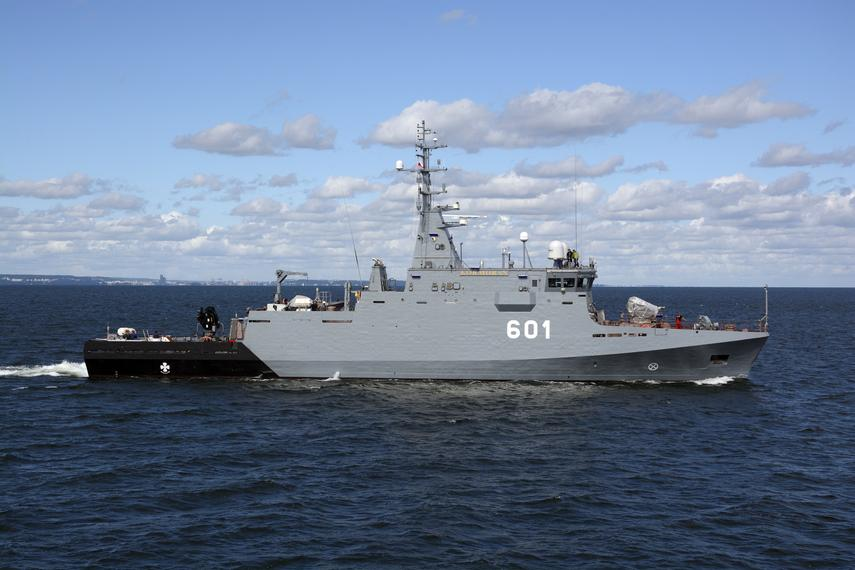
- ORP Kormoran

Class overview
- Builders: Remontowa Shipbuilding SA
- Operators: Marynarka Wojenna
- Preceded by: Project 206FM
- Planned: 6
- Building: 3
- Completed: 3
- Active: 3

General characteristics
- Type: Minehunter
- Displacement: 850 tons
- Length: 58.5 m (191 ft 11 in)
- Beam: 10.3 m (33 ft 10 in)
- Draft: 2.7 m (8 ft 10 in)
- Propulsion: 2 × MTU diesels; 2 × Voith-Schneider (cycloidal) propulsion systems
- Speed: 15 knots (28 km/h; 17 mph)
- Range: 2,500 nmi (4,600 km; 2,900 mi)
- Complement: 44
- Armament: Temporarily:*1 × ZU-23-2MR (two 23 mm guns and two Grom missiles) - first unit, to be replaced with the OSU-35K system at the next major renovation, 3 × WKM-Bm machine guns Final:*1 × OSU-35K 35 mm weapon station, Grom MANPADS, 3 × WKM-Bm machine guns

The Kormoran II (Cormorant class), formally Project 258, is a class of mine hunting vessels of the Polish Navy. Three ships of the class were ordered in 2013. The first unit was launched on 4 September 2015 and entered service in 2017. Three more ships have been ordered in 2022. Ships are built by Remontowa Shipbuilding Gdańsk and Naval Shipyard Gdynia consortium. It's armed with a 35mm OSU-35K naval weapon station.

== Construction ==
Project 258 vessels are 58.5 m (191 ft 11 in) long and 10.3 m (33 ft 10 in) wide. The draft is 2.7 m (8 ft 10 in) and the displacement is 830 tons. Contrary to previous construction concepts of this type, the hull was made of non-magnetic steel instead of plastic. The advantage of the steel hull was, among other things, lower operating costs and higher fire resistance. The hull itself is divided into 33 sections. The ship's superstructure has two floors in the fore section and one floor in the stern. The main deck has full bulwark. When constructing the ship, efforts were made to limit the unit's detectability by radars. It is powered by two combustion engines with a capacity of 1,360 hp each, which allows a maximum speed of 15 knots (28 km/h; 17 mph). Additionally, the minesweeper has a bow thruster. The main armament of the ship is the OSU-35K naval weapon system armed with a 35mm Oerlikon KDA autocannon. The ship is equipped with the Integrated Combat System manufactured and supplied by CTM, including: SCOT combat management system, passive defense system, underwater observation system, including SHL-101 / TM and SHL-300 sonar stations and a system of remotely and wirelessly fired charges explosives for destroying sea mines "Toczek". On the other hand, Xblue Inertial Navigation Systems (INS) have been selected to provide critical navigation capabilities to the Polish Navy’s new-build Kormoran II class mine countermeasure vessels.

== Description ==
The main tasks of the Kormoran II type units include searching, classification, identification and fighting sea mines, identification of fairways, guiding units through mine hazard waters, putting mines and remote control of self-propelled anti-mine platforms.

== Vessels ==
A lead ship ORP Kormoran (601) was commissioned on 28 November 2017. In summer 2018 building of a second ship of this project - named ORP Albatros (602) - was initiated. Albatros was launched on 10 October 2019 and entered service on 28 November 2022. Construction of third ship, ORP Mewa (603), started on 10 October 2019. Mewa was launched on 17 December 2020 and entered service on 22 December 2022. It's planned to build another 3 ships till the end of 2027 (initially 2031), first of which, ORP Jaskółka (604), construction started on 23 March 2023 and it's planned to enter service in July 2026. Two last vessels of Kormoran-II class, ORP Rybitwa (605) and ORP Czajka (606), are scheduled to start construction in December 2023, October 2024 and to enter service in March and October 2027 accordingly.

Name	Laid down	Launched	Commissioned	Status
ORP Kormoran (601)	23 September 2014	4 September 2015	28 November 2017	Active
ORP Albatros (602)	18 September 2018	19 October 2019	28 November 2022	Active
ORP Mewa (603)	10 October 2019	17 December 2020	14 February 2023	Active
ORP Jaskółka (604)	25 July 2023	26 June 2024		Launched
ORP Rybitwa (605)	20 March 2024	19 March 2025		Launched
ORP Czajka (606)	15 October 2024	11 December 2025		Launched
