= ORP Kormoran =

Polish mine hunting vessel

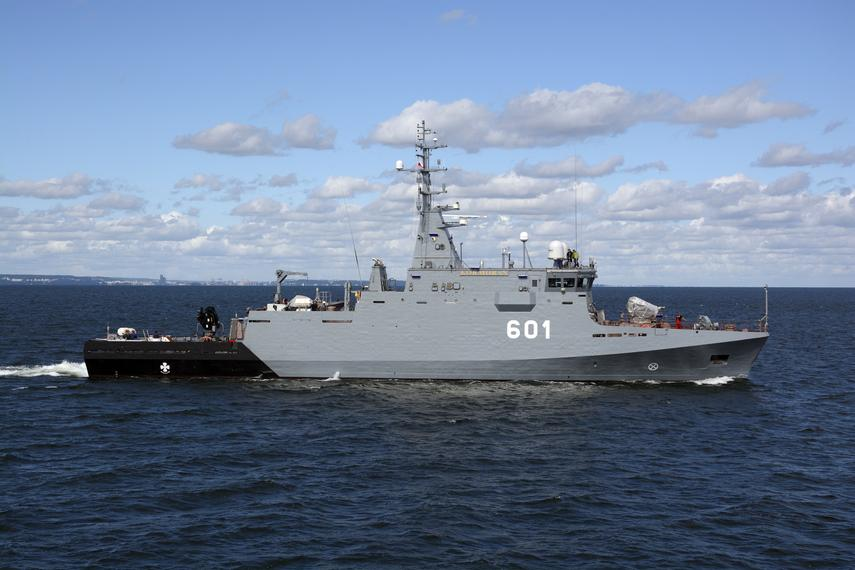
- ORP Kormoran during trials

History

Poland
- Name: ORP Kormoran (601)
- Builder: Remontowa Shipbuilding
- Laid down: 23 September 2014
- Launched: 4 September 2015
- Commissioned: 28 November 2017
- Identification: MMSI number: 261528000; Callsign: SQWK

General characteristics
- Class & type: Kormoran II
- Displacement: 830 tons (standard)
- Length: 58.5 m (192 ft)
- Beam: 10.3 m (34 ft)
- Draught: 2.7 m (8.9 ft)
- Propulsion: 2 MTU 8V369TE74L diesel engines; 2 × Cyclorotors
- Speed: 15 kn (28 km/h)
- Complement: up to 45
- Sensors & processing systems: Double Eagle Mk. III, Hugin 1000MR UUVs, Morświn ROV, SHL-101 TM keel sonar and SHL-300 self-propelled sonar
- Armament: ZU-23-2MR Wróbel II, caliber 23 mm (to be replaced with the ship artillery system of the caliber 35 mm OSU-35K), 3x WKM-Bm 12.7 mm machine guns, Grom missile launchers

ORP Kormoran (601) is the lead ship of Polish Navy's Kormoran II class MCMVs. She was laid down on 23 September 2014, launched on 4 September 2015 at Remontowa Shipbuilding yard in Gdańsk and commissioned on 28 November 2017. Her non-magnetic 58.5 meters in length hull was made from austenitic steel. She has 830 tons of standard displacement. Kormoran employs sophisticated mine countermeasures including underwater drones. The ship serves in the 13 Minesweeper Squadron, belonging to 8th Coastal Defence Flotilla.

== Building ==
The contract between the Armament Inspectorate and the consortium of Remontowa Shipbuilding SA, the Research and Development Center of the Maritime Technology Center in Gdynia and the Naval Shipyard SA for the construction of a prototype of a minehunter and two serial units was concluded on 23 September 2013. A few weeks later, tests of the vessel model, designed by Remontowa Marine Design & Consulting, began in the swimming pool of Centrum Techniki Okrętowej. A few months later, on September 23 of the same year, the keel was ceremonially laid at the Remontowa shipyard, and a day later the sheet metal cutting ceremony took place. Due to the non-magnetic steel, the welding of the hull sheets was carried out in a sterile hall with a controlled interior temperature .

ORP "Kormoran" was launched on September 4, 2015 in Gdańsk, in the presence of Prime Minister Ewa Kopacz, the godmother of the ship was the widow of the Navy commander, admiral Andrzej Karweta - Maria Jolanta Karweta. After launching the vessel, the process of equipping it and completing the crew began, and in the second half of September this year, the installation of the ship's weapons was also started. "Kormoran" became the first ship in 23 years to be completely designed and built in Poland. In April 2016, the ship was subjected to one hundred and several dozen tethered tests to check all the ship's mechanisms and systems, and on July 13, the ship left the shipyard to conduct sea tests. Work on the ship ended on March 31, 2017. On October 17, 2017, the state qualification research that started on June 19 was completed.

== Construction ==
The hull of the ship is 58.5 meters long, 10.3 meters wide and has a displacement of 830 tons, made of austenitic stainless steel, which reduces the detectability of the ship's physical fields. The choice of austenitic steel was dictated by its very low magnetic permeability and corrosion resistance. The length between the perpendiculars is 55.58 meters, the width at the waterline is 9.75 meters, and the height to the superstructure deck is 6.4 meters. The height to the main deck at the stern is 4.7 meters, while the design draft is 2.7 meters. The hull consists of 9 watertight compartments structurally divided into 33 separate and then joined sections. The ship has the L-3 ice class. The shape of the hull and superstructure is optimized to reduce the effective area of radar reflection.

The ship's power plant consists of two MTU 8V369TE74L diesel engines with an output power of 1000 kW - 1360 HP, supplemented by three MTU 6R1600M20S generating sets with a rated power of 380 kVA each. The ship's propulsion is transmitted via shafts to two Voith-Schneider Voith Turbo 21 GH / 160 cycloidal propellers. In order to increase the maneuverability of the unit and at the same time increase the ship's safety level, ORP "Kormoran" was also equipped with a Schottel STT 170 AMAG bow thruster with a power of 100 kW. Such a configured propulsion system enables the vessel to travel at a speed of at least 15 knots, and provides a range of not less than 2500 nautical miles. The structure of the ship allows it to be operated with a standard crew of 45 people, while providing space for an additional 7 people. "Kormoran" is adapted to operate in conditions of nuclear, biological and chemical weapons.
