= ORP Albatros =

Polish mine hunting vessel

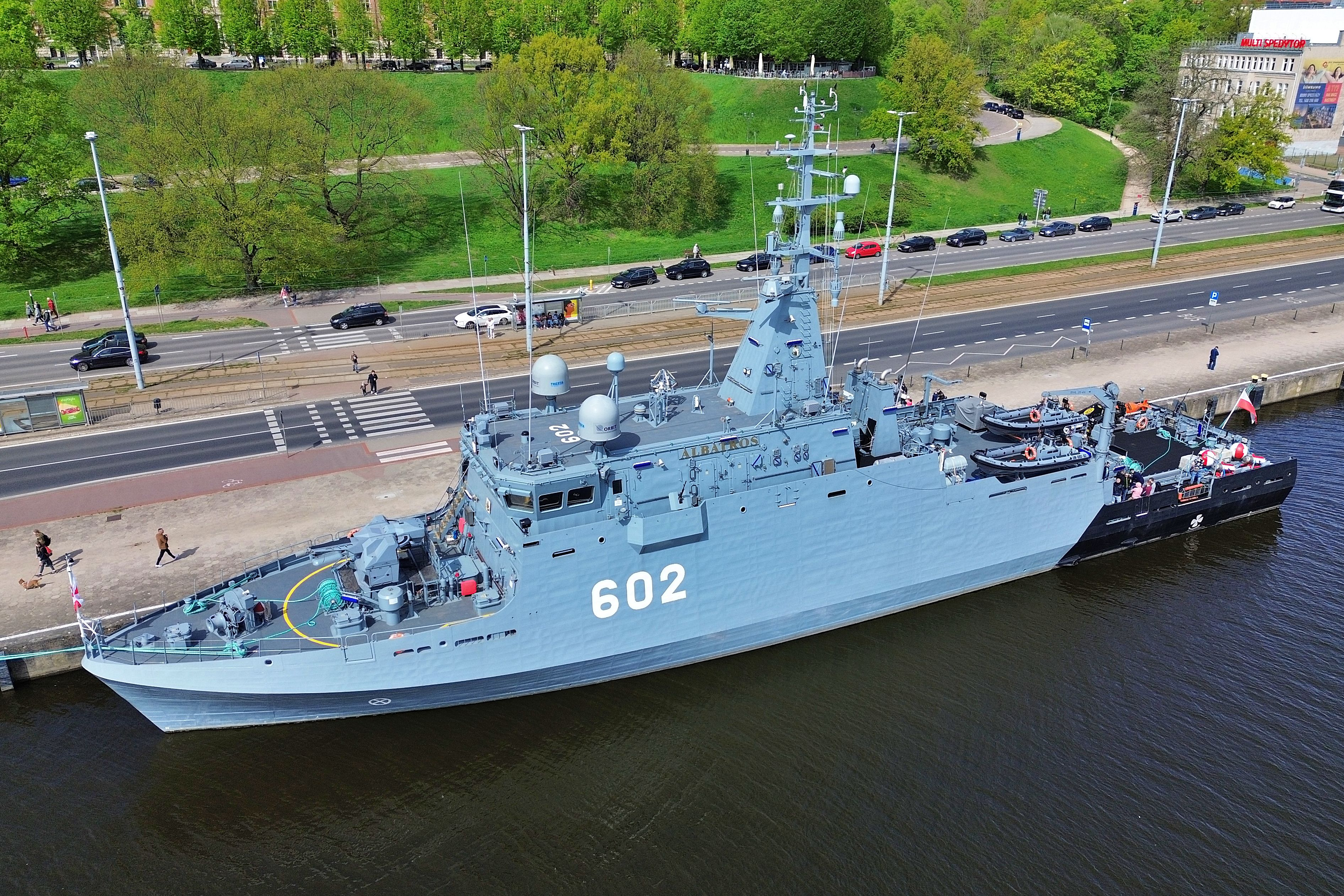

History

Poland
- Name: ORP Albatros (602)
- Builder: Remontowa Shipbuilding
- Laid down: 18 September 2018
- Launched: 10 October 2019

General characteristics
- Class & type: Kormoran II
- Displacement: 830 tons (standard)
- Length: 58.5 m (192 ft)
- Beam: 10.3 m (34 ft)
- Draught: 2.7 m (8.9 ft)
- Propulsion: 2 MTU 8V369TE74L diesel engines; 2 × Cyclorotors
- Speed: 15 kn (28 km/h)
- Complement: up to 45
- Sensors & processing systems: Double Eagle Mk. III, Hugin 1000MR UUVs, Morświn ROV, SHL-101 TM keel sonar and SHL-300 self-propelled sonar
- Armament: OSU-35K 35 mm autocannon, 3x WKM-Bm 12.7 mm machine guns, Grom missile launchers

ORP Albatros (602) is a ship of Polish Navy's Kormoran II class MCMVs. She was laid down on 18 September 2018, and launched on 19 October 2019 at Remontowa Shipbuilding yard in Gdańsk. Her non-magnetic 58.5 meter hull is made from austenitic steel. She has a standard displacement of 830 tons. Kormoran employs sophisticated mine countermeasures including underwater drones. The ship will enter service in the 13 Minesweeper Squadron belonging to 8th Coastal Defence Flotilla.

== Construction ==
The contract between the Armament Inspectorate and the Remontowa Shipbuilding SA consortium, the Research and Development Center of the Maritime Technology Center in Gdynia and the Naval Shipyard SA for the construction of a prototype and two serial units was concluded on 23 September 2013. The sheet metal cutting started on September 18, 2018, and less than three months later, on December 5, 2018, the ceremonial keel laying ceremony took place at the Remontowa shipyard. Due to the non-magnetic steel, the welding of the hull sheets was carried out in a sterile hall with a controlled interior temperature.

ORP "Albatros" was launched on October 10, 2019 in Gdańsk, in the presence of, among others: Piotr Soyek – president of the Remontowa Holding capital group accompanied by the management boards of Remontowa Shipbuilding SA, Remontowa SA and other companies of the Remontowa Holding group, as well as Janusz Dilling – Deputy Ship Director at PRS, Rev. Wiesław Szlachetka – auxiliary bishop of the Gdańsk Archdiocese, Col. Waldemar Bogusławski – deputy head of the Armaments Inspectorate, Zbigniew Ptak – representative of the Marshal of the Pomeranian Voivodeship, representatives of the Research and Development Center of the Maritime Technology Center, headed by the president of Wiśniewski, Piotr Nowak, former Vice President of the Wiśniewski President, MW incl. vice admiral Jerzy Patz, commander of the Naval Operations Center – commander of the Maritime Component vice admiral Krzysztof Jaworski, deputy naval inspector rear admiral Krzysztof Zdonek, counter. Piotr Nieć – commander of the 8th FOW, Lieutenant Commander Jarosław Iwańczuk – commander of the 13 Minesweeper Squadron, as well as the commander of the ship being launched, Naval Captain – Michał Narłowski. Krystyna Patz, wife of Vice Admiral Jerzy Patz, became the godmother of ORP Albatros.

== Design ==
The hull of the ship is 58.5 meters long, 10.3 meters wide and has a displacement of 830 tons, made of austenitic stainless steel, which reduces the detectability of the ship's physical fields. The choice of austenitic steel was dictated by its very low magnetic permeability and corrosion resistance. The length between the perpendiculars is 55.58 meters, the width at the waterline is 9.75 meters, and the height to the superstructure deck is 6.4 meters. The height to the main deck at the stern is 4.7 meters, while the design draft is 2.7 meters. The hull consists of 9 watertight compartments structurally divided into 33 separate and then joined sections. The ship has the L-3 ice class. The shape of the hull and superstructure is optimized to reduce the effective area of radar reflection.

The ship's power plant consists of two MTU 8V369TE74L diesel engines with an output power of 1000 kW – 1360 HP, supplemented by three MTU 6R1600M20S generating sets with a rated power of 380 kVA each. The ship's propulsion is transmitted via shafts to two Voith-Schneider Voith Turbo 21 GH / 160 cycloidal propellers. In order to increase the maneuverability of the unit and at the same time increase the ship's safety level, ORP "Albatros" was also equipped with a Schottel STT 170 AMAG bow thruster with a power of 100 kW. Such a configured propulsion system enables the vessel to travel at a speed of at least 15 knots, and provides a range of not less than 2,500 nautical miles. The structure of the ship allows it to be operated with a standard crew of 45 people, while providing space for an additional 7 people. "Albatros" is adapted to operate in nuclear, biological and chemical threat environments.
