= ORP Mewa (603) =

Polish mine hunting vessel

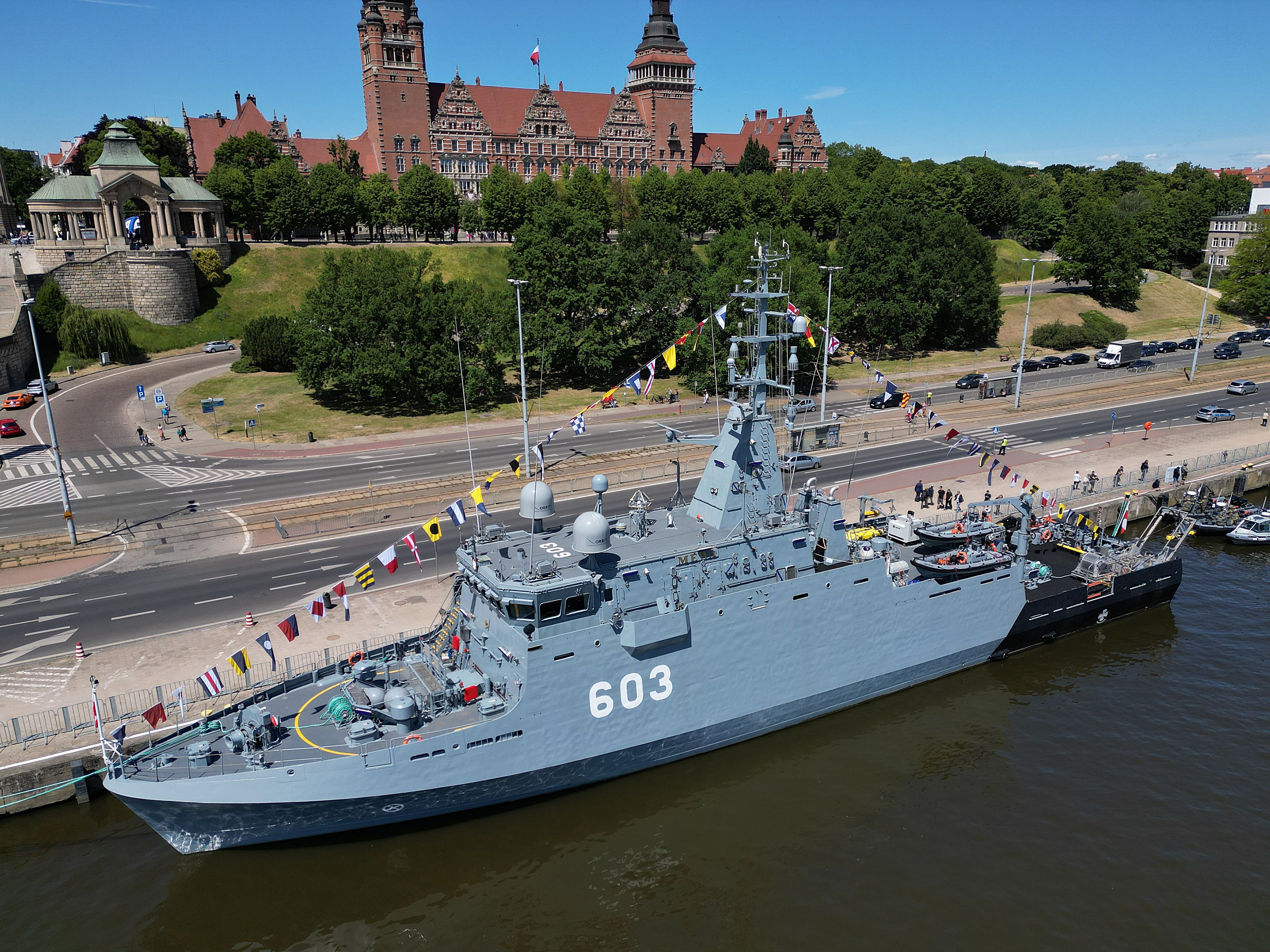

History

Poland
- Name: ORP Mewa (603)
- Builder: Remontowa Shipbuilding
- Laid down: 10 September 2019
- Launched: 17 December 2020

General characteristics
- Class & type: Kormoran II
- Displacement: 830 tons (standard)
- Length: 58.5 m (192 ft)
- Beam: 10.3 m (34 ft)
- Draught: 2.7 m (8.9 ft)
- Ice class: L3 (Ice 2)
- Propulsion: 2 MTU 8V369TE74L diesel engines; 2 × Cyclorotors
- Speed: 15 kn (28 km/h)
- Range: 2,500 nmi (4,630 km; 2,877 mi)
- Capacity: 52 people
- Complement: up to 45
- Sensors & processing systems: Double Eagle Mk. III, Hugin 1000MR UUVs, Morświn ROV, SHL-101 TM keel sonar and SHL-300 self-propelled sonar
- Armament: OSU-35K 35 mm autocannon, 3x WKM-Bm 12.7 mm machine guns, Grom missile launchers

ORP Mewa (603) is a ship of Polish Navy's Kormoran II class MCMVs. She was laid down on 10 October 2019, and launched on 17 December 2020 at Remontowa Shipbuilding yard in Gdańsk. Her non-magnetic 58.5 meter hull is made from austenitic steel. She has a standard displacement of 830 tons. Kormoran employs sophisticated mine countermeasures including underwater drones. The ship will enter service in the 13 Minesweeper Squadron belonging to 8th Coastal Defence Flotilla.

== Construction ==
The contract between the Armament Inspectorate and the Remontowa Shipbuilding SA consortium, the Research and Development Center of the Maritime Technology Center in Gdynia and the Naval Shipyard SA for the construction of a prototype and two serial units was concluded on 23 September 2013. The sheet metal cutting started on 19 June 2019. On 10 October 2019, a ceremonial keel laying ceremony took place at the Remontowa shipyard. Due to the non-magnetic steel, welding of the hull sheets was carried out in a sterile hall with a controlled interior temperature. On 17 December 2020 at the Remontowa Shipbuilding S.A. shipyard, ORP Mewa was officially launched and baptized. Anna Kułagin was the godmother.

== Design ==
The hull of the ship is 58.5 meters long, 10.3 meters wide and has a displacement of 830 tons, made of austenitic stainless steel, which reduces the detectability of the ship's physical fields. The choice of austenitic steel was dictated by its very low magnetic permeability and corrosion resistance. The length between the perpendiculars is 55.58 meters, the width at the waterline is 9.75 meters, and the height to the superstructure deck is 6.4 meters. The height to the main deck at the stern is 4.7 meters, while the design draft is 2.7 meters. The hull consists of 9 watertight compartments structurally divided into 33 separate and then joined sections. The ship has the L3 (Ice 2) ice class, as classified according to the rules of the Ice class# Polish Register of Shipping (Polski Rejestr Statków). The shape of the hull and superstructure is optimized to reduce the effective area of radar reflection.

The ship's power plant consists of two MTU 8V369TE74L diesel engines with an output power of 1000 kW – 1360 HP, supplemented by three MTU 6R1600M20S generating sets with a rated power of 380 kVA each. The ship's propulsion is transmitted via shafts to two Voith-Schneider Voith Turbo 21 GH / 160 cycloidal propellers. In order to increase the maneuverability of the unit and at the same time increase the ship's safety level, ORP "Albatros" was also equipped with a Schottel STT 170 AMAG bow thruster with a power of 100 kW. Such a configured propulsion system enables the vessel to travel at a speed of at least 15 knots, and provides a range of not less than 2500 nautical miles. The structure of the ship allows it to be operated with a standard crew of 45 people, while providing space for an additional 7 people. "Mewa" is adapted to operate in nuclear, biological and chemical threat environments.
