= Riverine Flotilla of the Polish Navy order of battle =

The following is the order of battle of the Riverine Flotilla of the Polish Navy, an integral part of the Polish Navy in the period between the world wars.

== Staff and the headquarters ==
Initially subordinate to the Referee of the Riverine Fleet in the Ministry of Military Affairs in Warsaw, in 1932 it was separated as a semi-independent branch of the navy based in Pińsk. In 1939 the commander of the Riverine Flotilla was Cmdr. Witold Zajączkowski and his chief of staff was Cmdr. Władysław Szczekowski. Other members of the staff were:

- Deputy commanding officer Cmdr. Henryk Eibel
- Artillery officer Cmdr. Włodzimierz Kleszczyński
- Technical officer Cmdr. Wacław Trzebiński
- Signals officer Cmdr. Bronisław Witkowski
- Intelligence officer Cmdr. Narcyz Małuszyński
- Head surgeon Cmdr. Władysław Kozłowski
- Chaplain Maj. rev. Henryk Antonowicz
- Flags officer Cmdr. Janusz Marciniewski

== Riverine Flotilla ==
=== Staff vessels ===
- ORP Admirał Sierpinek command vessel (armed paddle steamer)
- S 1 liaison motorboat
- S 2 liaison motorboat
- Nr. 5 speed-boat

=== Combat groups ===
==== 1st Combat Group ====
- ORP Kraków river monitor (Capt. Jerzy Wojciechowski)
- ORP Wilno river monitor (Capt. Edmund Jodkowski)
- ORP Zuchwała gunboat
- ORP Zaradna gunboat
- KU 16 (KU being an acronym of Kuter Uzbrojony, that is armed cutter in Polish; similar in shape and armament to later PT boats and PBRs)
- KU 17 armed cutter
- KU 18 armed cutter
- KU 19 armed cutter
- KU 21 armed cutter
- K 20 barrack ship (krypa in Polish terminology)
- ORP Generał Sikorski anti-air defence armed paddle steamer (Capt. Władysław Fidosz - name uncertain)
- Nr. 1 speed-boat

==== 2nd Combat Group ====
- ORP Warszawa river monitor (Capt. Jan May)
- ORP Horodyszcze river monitor (Capt. Andrzej Marzecki)
- KU 22 armed cutter
- KU 24 armed cutter
- KU 25 armed cutter
- KU 26 armed cutter
- K 8 barrack ship
- ORP Hetman Chodkiewicz anti-air defence armed paddle steamer (Capt. Edward Kulesza)
- Nr. 2 speed-boat

==== 3rd Combat Group ====
- ORP Pińsk river monitor (Capt. Jan Kierkus)
- ORP Toruń river monitor (Capt. Bolesław Parydzaj)
- KU 7 armed cutter (reconnaissance)
- KU 23 armed cutter (service)
- KU 27 armed cutter
- KU 28 armed cutter
- KU 29 armed cutter
- K 10 barrack ship
- ORP Generał Szeptycki minelayer (armed paddle steamer)
- Nr. 3 speed-boat

=== Support units ===
==== Mine and gas warfare detachment ====
- ORP Mątwa minelayer, capable of gas warfare and supporting a troop of engineers
- T 1, T 2 and T 3 T 5 class river minesweepers
- T 4, T 5, T 6 and T 7 T 1 class river minesweepers

==== Liaison unit ====
- KM 14 liaison cutter
- KM 15 liaison cutter
- K 2 floating signals base (radio station)
- P 3 motorboat
- Two platoons of signal troops and recce squads

==== Base ====
- KU 1 armed cutter
- KU 2 armed cutter
- KU 3 armed cutter
- ORP Neptun tugboat
- ORP Generał Sosnkowski hospital ship
- K 12 floating munitions depot
- K 13 floating munitions depot
- K 14 floating fuel depot
- K 15 floating fuel depot
- K 25 floating fuel depot
- K 17 canteen
- K 19 floating service and repair vessel
- K 7 frogmen support vessel
- K 9 floating barracks
- K 30 floating barracks

=== Riverine Air Escadrille ===
- K 4 barrack vessel
- P 4 motorboat
- Nr. 7 speed-boat
- Three R-17W seaplanes (mobilized separately)

=== Pińsk naval base ===
- ORP Kiliński tugboat
- P 1 motorboat
- P 2 motorboat
- Fifteen service vessels of various types
- AA platoon
- Signals platoon
- Administrative service platoon

== War-time reorganization ==
On September 15, 1939, the Riverine Flotilla received orders from the commanding officer of the Independent Operational Group Polesie, Gen. Franciszek Kleeberg. Because of a possible breakthrough of the German forces in the northern sector of the front, the orders for the Flotilla were to prepare a defence of a 200 kilometres long front along the Prypeć river. The forces were to be divided into 8 semi-independent task forces, each defending a separate part of the river. However, a particularly dry and sunny summer resulted in shallow waters preventing many ships from reaching their area of operations. In addition, the Soviet invasion of September 17, 1939, made the plans obsolete.

=== Janów Group ===
- 2 × armed cutters
- naval infantry platoon
- 1 × Bofors 40 mm L/60 gun

=== Kaczanowicze Group ===
- ORP Kraków river monitor
- ORP Zuchwała gunboat
- 2 × armed cutters

=== Horodyszcze Group ===
- ORP Wilno monitor
- ORP Zawzięta gunboat
- ORP Zaradna gunboat
- 2 × minesweepers
- rifle company

=== Lemieszewicze Group ===
- K 2 signals boat
- 2 × liaison cutters (?)
- 2 × liaison platoons

=== Mosty Wolańskie Group ===
- ORP Horodyszcze monitor
- ORP Warszawa monitor
- ORP Generał Sikorski AA ship
- ORP Hetman Chodkiewicz AA ship
- ORP Generał Sosnkowski hospital ship
- 2 × armed cutters

=== Przewóz Łachewski Group ===
- ORP Pińsk monitor
- ORP Toruń monitor
- 6 × armed cutters

=== Nyrcza Group ===
- ORP Mątwa
- 2 × minesweepers

=== Sytnica Group ===
- ORP Admirał Siercinek HQ ship

== See also ==
- Polish Defensive War
- Vessels of Polish Riverine Flotilla
- Riverine Flotilla of the Polish Navy
