= Lublin-class minelayer-landing ship =

1988 ship class of the Polish Navy

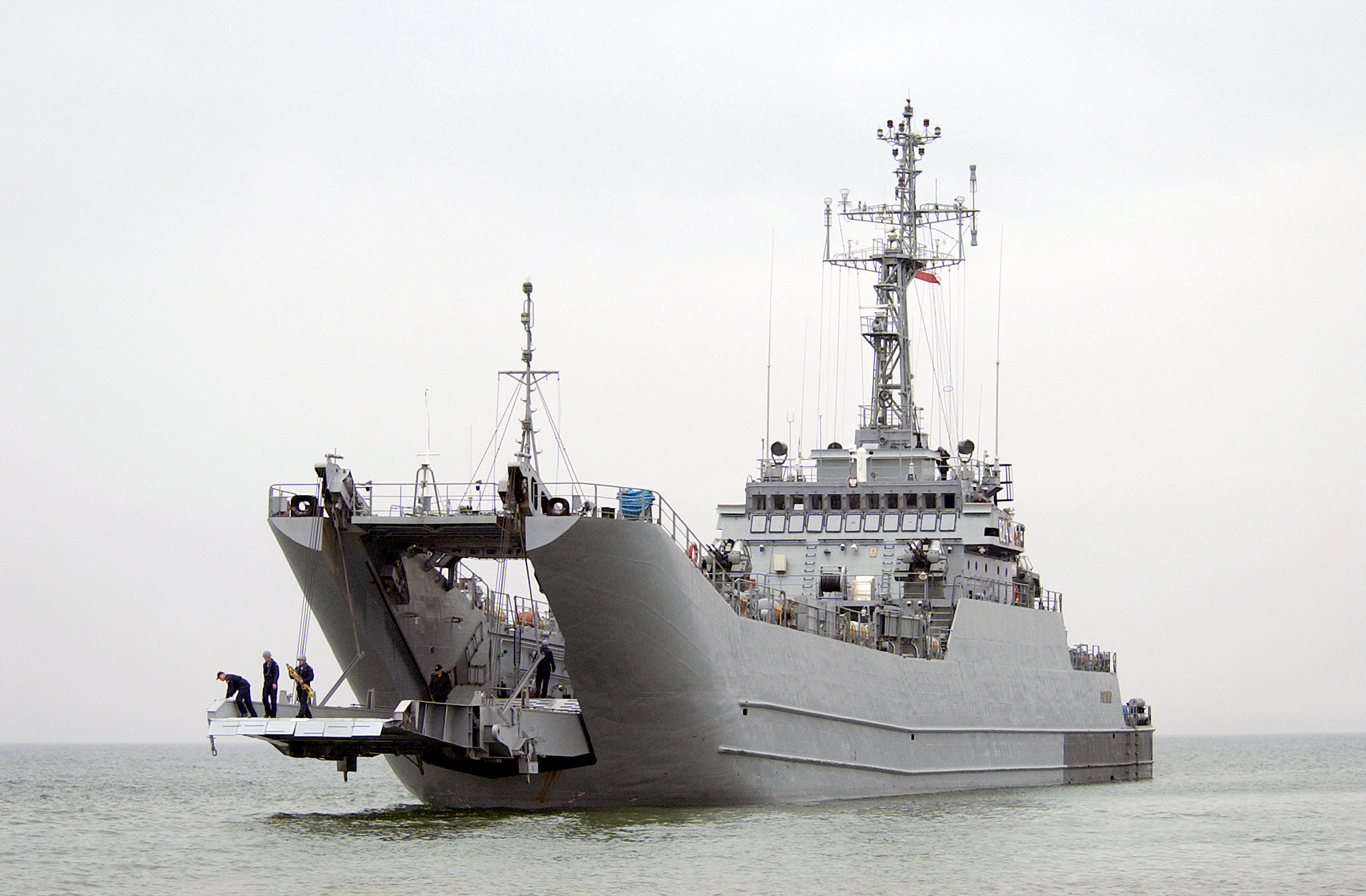
- ORP Poznań

Class overview
- Name: Lublin class
- Builders: Northern Shipyard, Gdańsk
- Operators: Polish Navy
- Preceded by: Północny class
- In commission: 1989–present
- Planned: 12
- Completed: 5
- Canceled: 7
- Active: 5

General characteristics
- Type: Minelayer-landing ship
- Displacement: 1,745 tonnes
- Length: 95.8 m (314 ft 4 in)
- Beam: 10.8 m (35 ft 5 in)
- Draft: 2.38 m (7 ft 10 in)
- Propulsion: 3x Cegielski-Sulzer 6ATL25D 1,320 kW (1,770 hp) each
- Speed: 16.5 knots (30.6 km/h; 19.0 mph)
- Range: 850 nmi (1,570 km; 980 mi)
- Troops: 135
- Complement: 37
- Armament: 4 × ZU-23-2MR units composed of two 23 mm guns and two Strela-2M surface-to-air missile system; 9 × ŁWD 100/5000 MCLC launching tubes

The Lublin class or Projekt 767 are minelayer-landing ships designed and built in Poland for the Polish Navy, in service since 1989. Only five out of the twelve planned ships were built, by the Northern Shipyard in Gdańsk, due to the fall of Communism. They can carry up to 9 T-72 tanks or 17 transport vehicles such as the Star 266 and 135 equipped troops. They were designed to carry up to 134 naval mines. The ships are named after the chief cities of the Piast dynasty.

On 12 October 2007, ORP Lublin became an honorary citizen of Lublin.

== Background ==
ORP Gryf was a Polish mine-laying vessel and, likely, the only heavy mine-laying vessel built.

== List of ships ==
Pennant number	Name	Commissioned	Status
821	ORP Lublin	12 October 1989	In service
822	ORP Gniezno	23 February 1990	In service
823	ORP Kraków	27 June 1990	In service
824	ORP Poznań	8 March 1991	In service
825	ORP Toruń	24 May 1991	In service

== Gallery ==
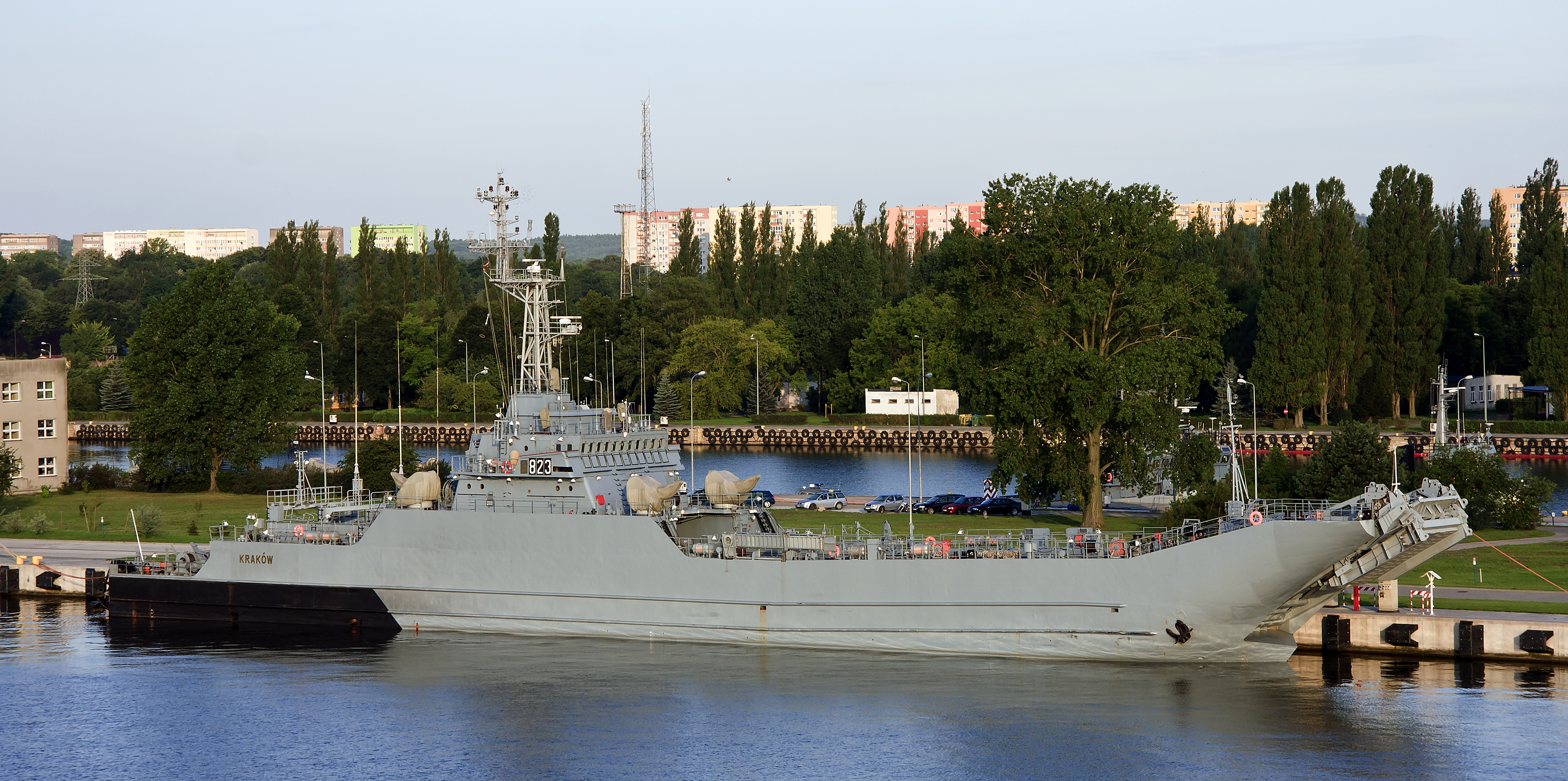
ORP Kraków

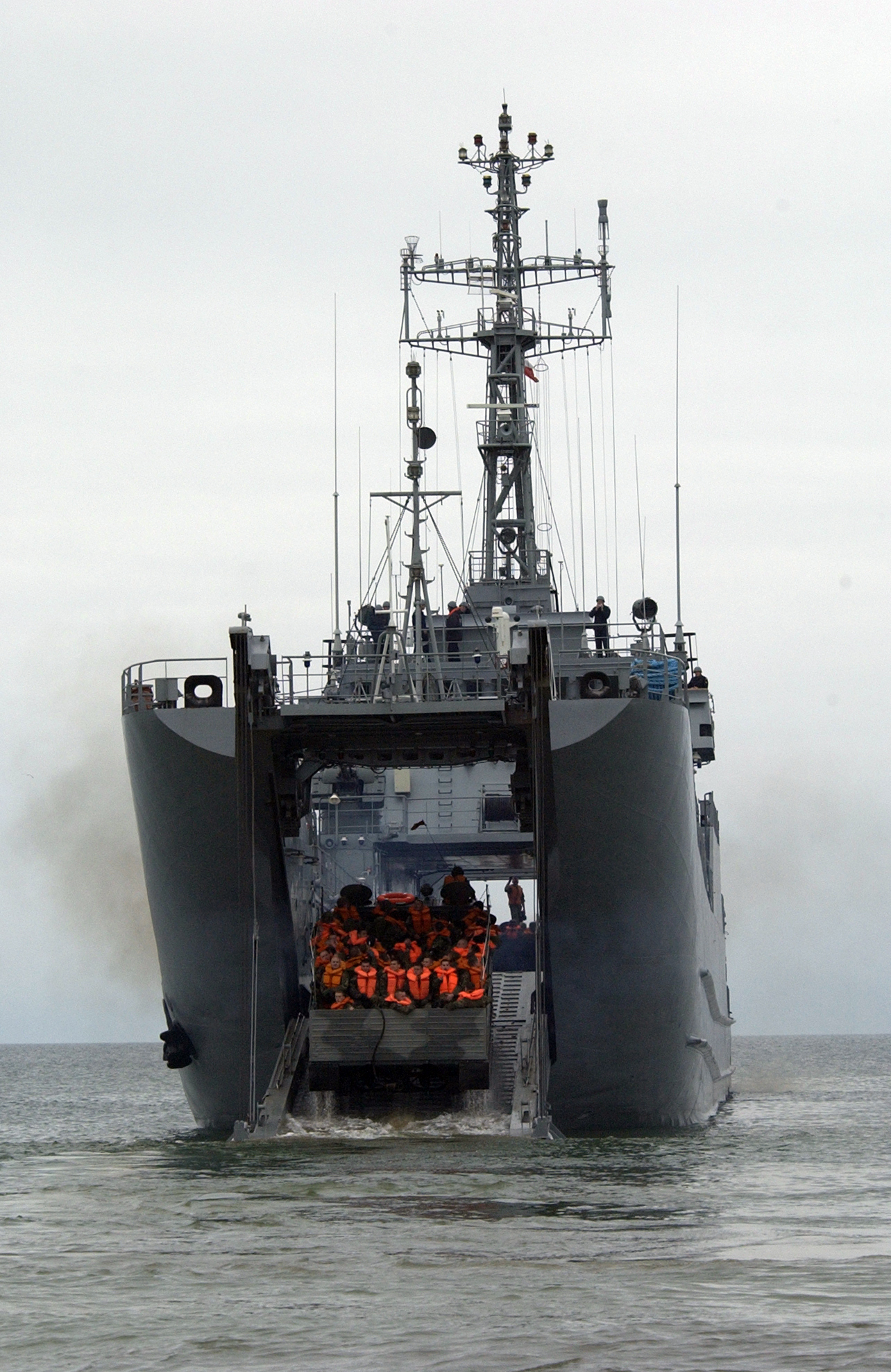
ORP Poznań

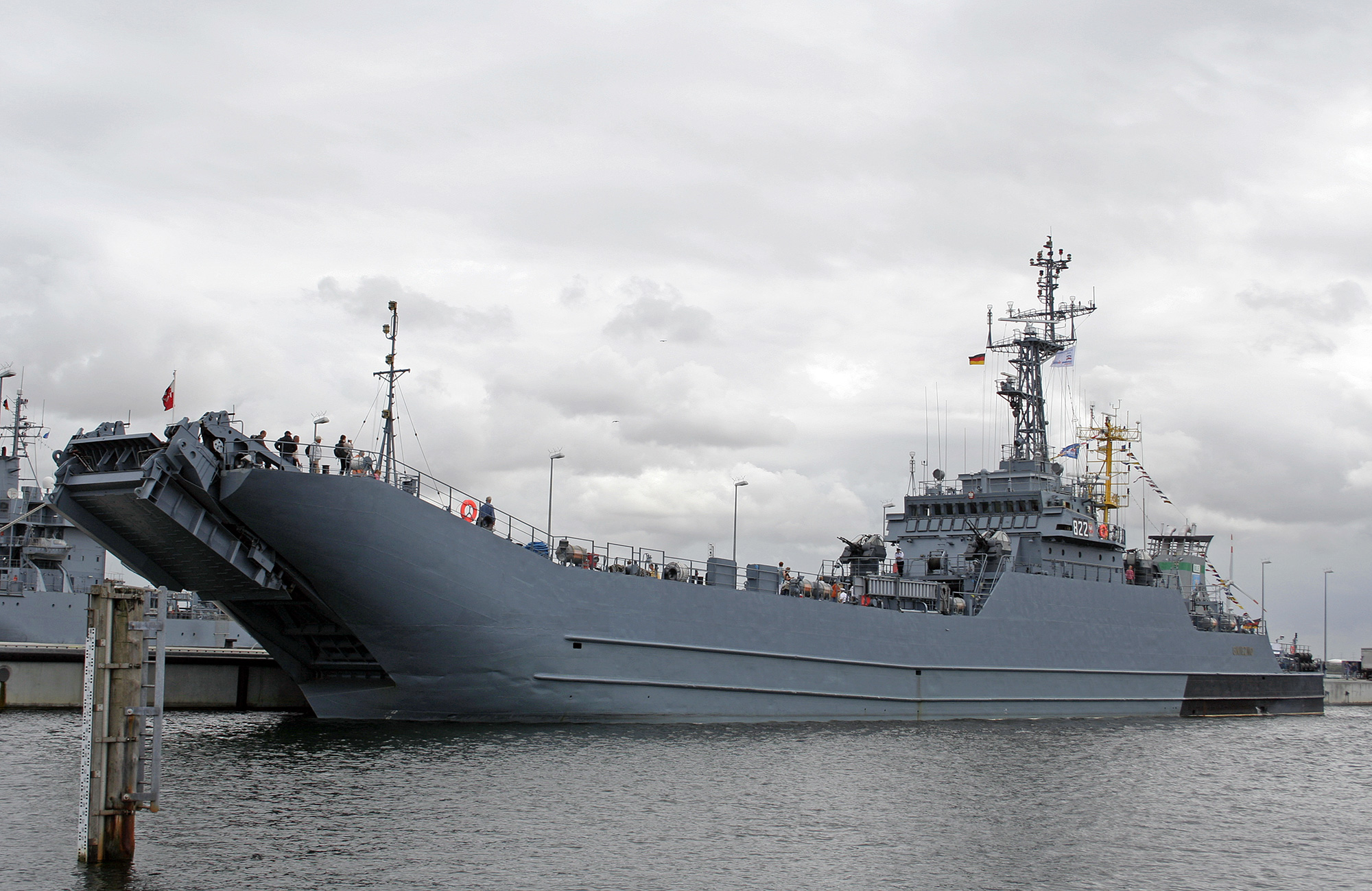
ORP Gniezno

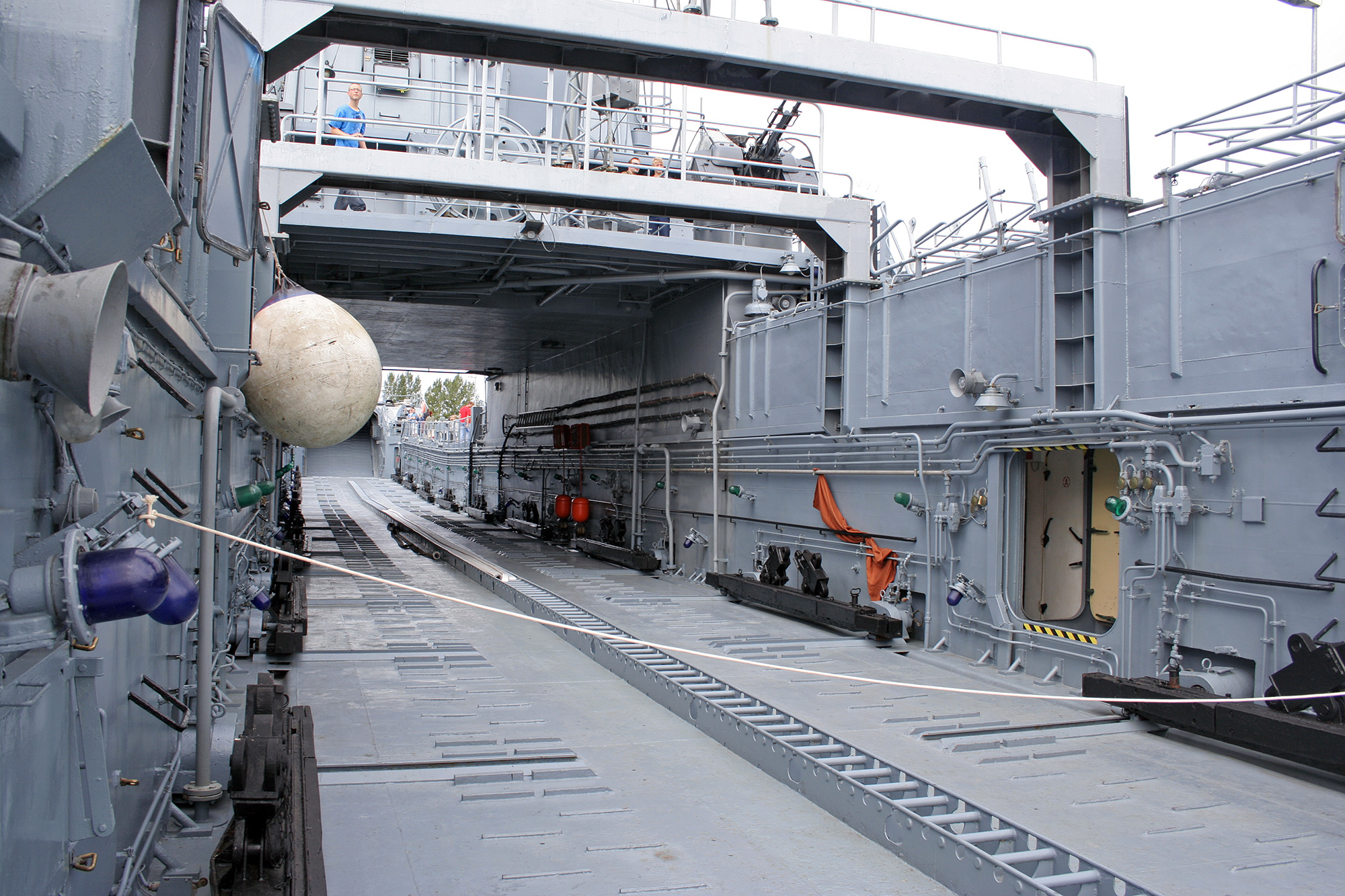
ORP Gniezno

== See also ==
Equivalent landing ships of the same era

- Silba class
