= ORP Lublin =

Lublin-class minelayer landing ship

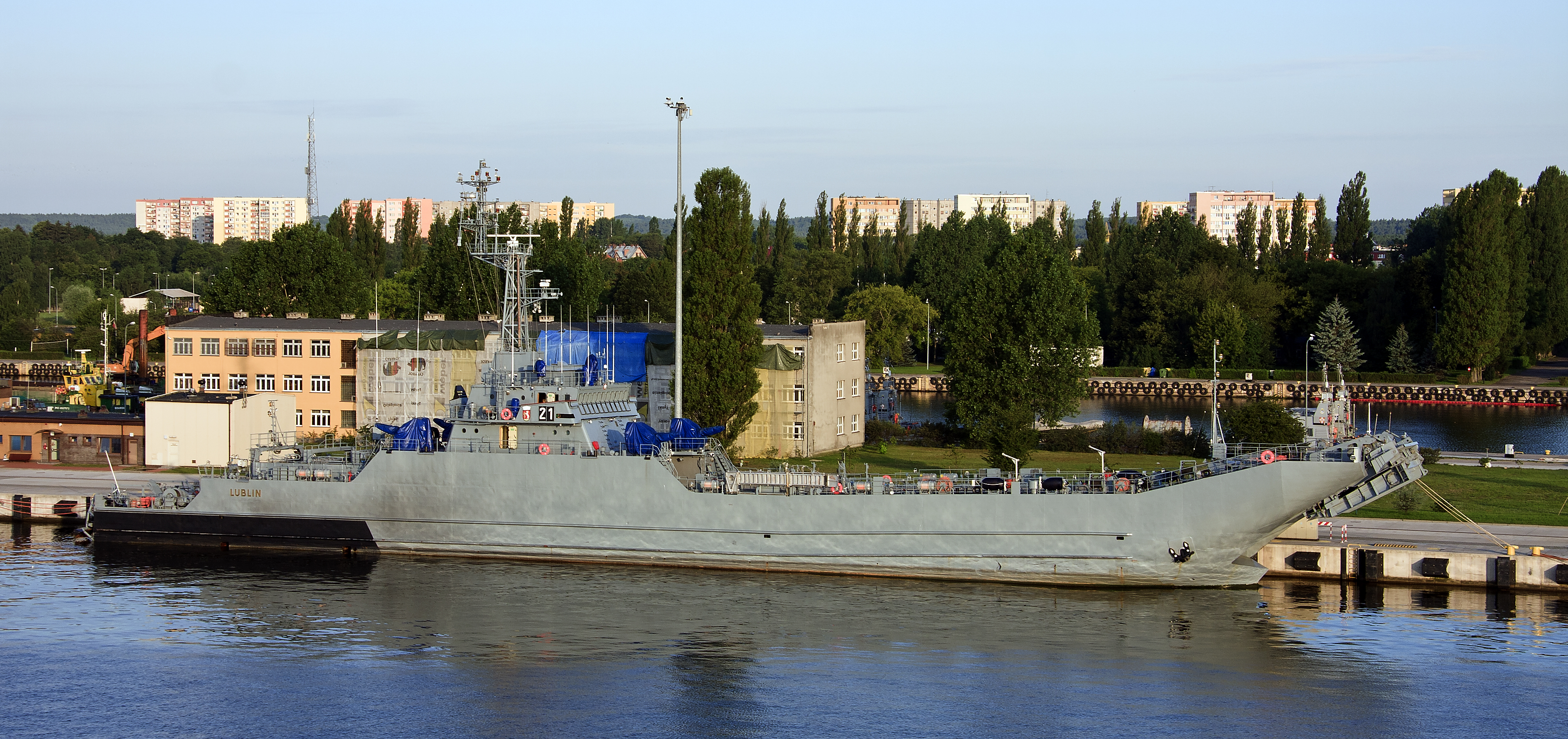
- ORP Lublin Świnoujście on 31 July 2012.

History

Poland
- Name: Lublin
- Namesake: Lublin
- Builder: Northern Shipyard, Gdańsk
- Laid down: 8 December 1987
- Launched: 12 July 1988
- Commissioned: 12 October 1989
- Identification: MMSI number: 261233000; Callsign: SOWB; Pennant number: 821
- Status: Active

General characteristics
- Class & type: Lublin-class minelayer-landing ship
- Tonnage: 1675 tones
- Length: 95.8 m (314 ft 4 in)
- Beam: 10.8 m (35 ft 5 in)
- Depth: 2.38 m (7 ft 10 in)
- Installed power: 3x Cegielski-Sulzer 6ATL25D 1320 kW each
- Speed: 16.5 knots
- Capacity: 9 landing vessels up to 45 tones each
- Armament: 2 × ZU-23-2MR units composed of two 23 mm guns and two Strela-2M surface-to-air missile system; 9 × ŁWD 100/5000 launching tubes

ORP Lublin (821) is a Lublin-class minelayer-landing ship of Polish Navy, named after the city of Lublin.

== Construction and career ==
The flag was raised on 12 October 1989. The ship is part of the 2nd Transport and Mine Ship Squadron in Świnoujście, belonging to the 8th Coastal Defense Flotilla. The ship is intended for transporting landing troops with equipment and vehicles, setting sea mines (takes 130 mines at a time) and evacuating people. It is the first ship in the history of the Polish navy commanded by a woman.

== Gallery ==
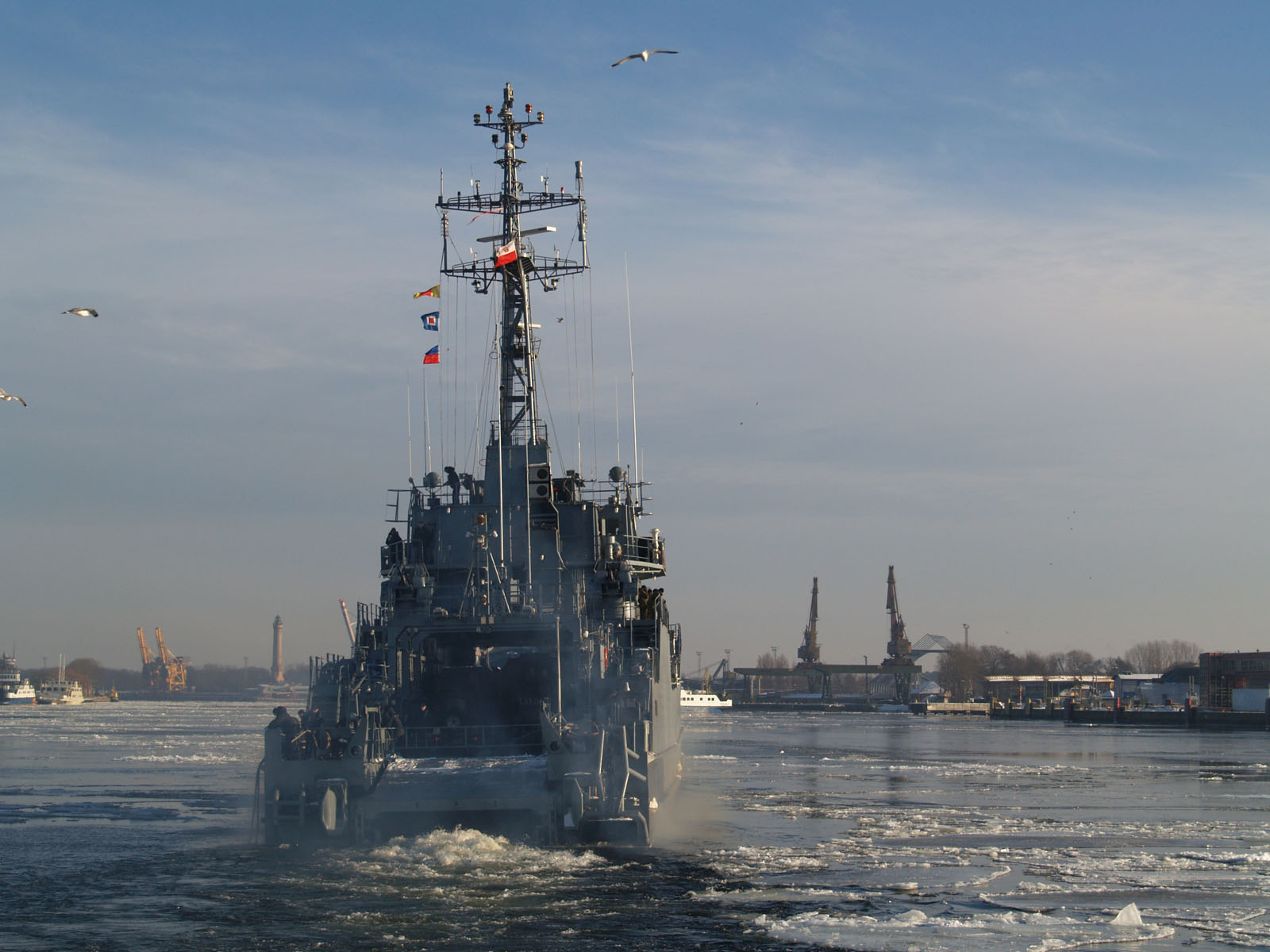
ORP Lublin on 22 January 2010.

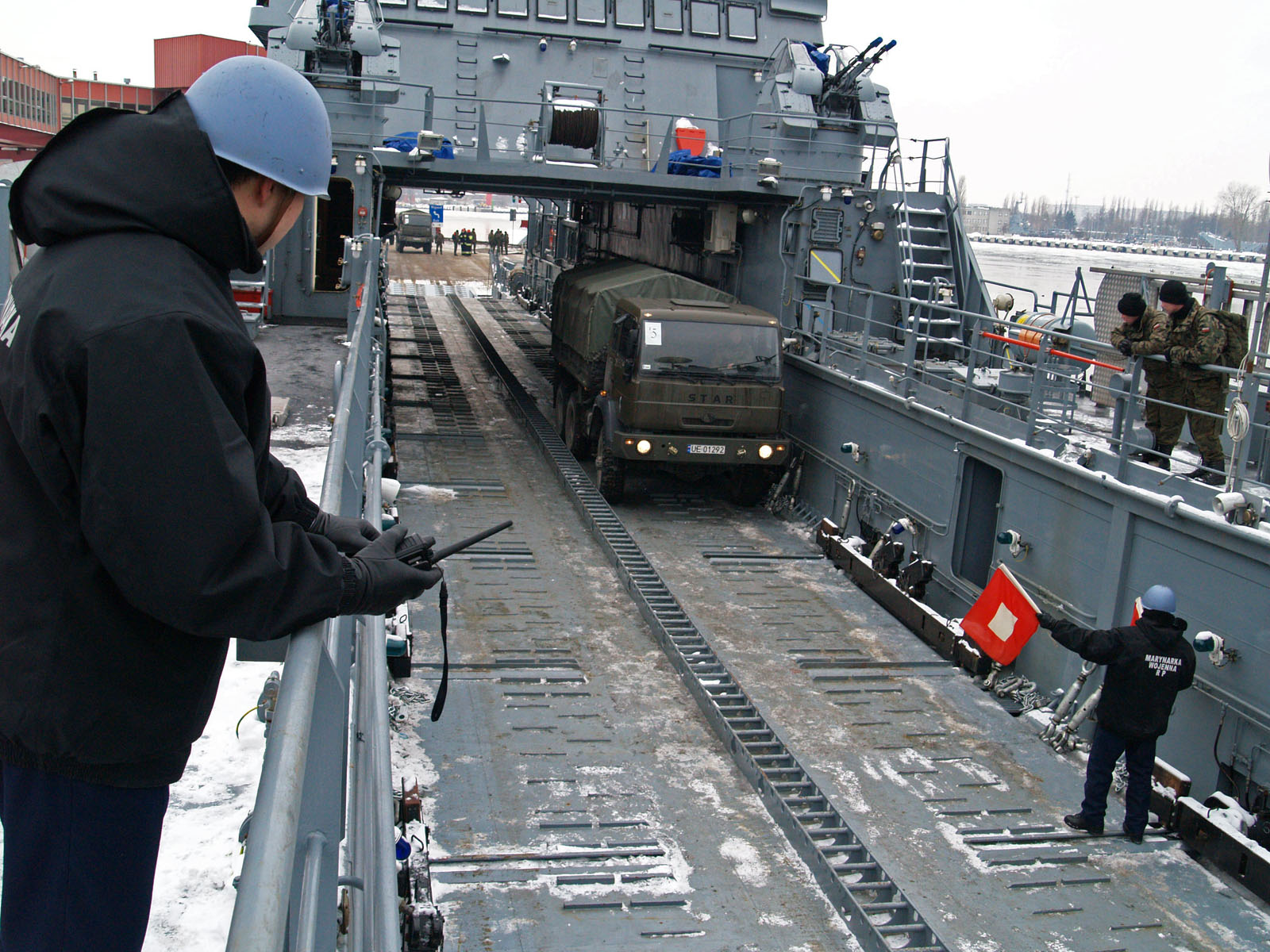
ORP Lublin on 22 January 2010.

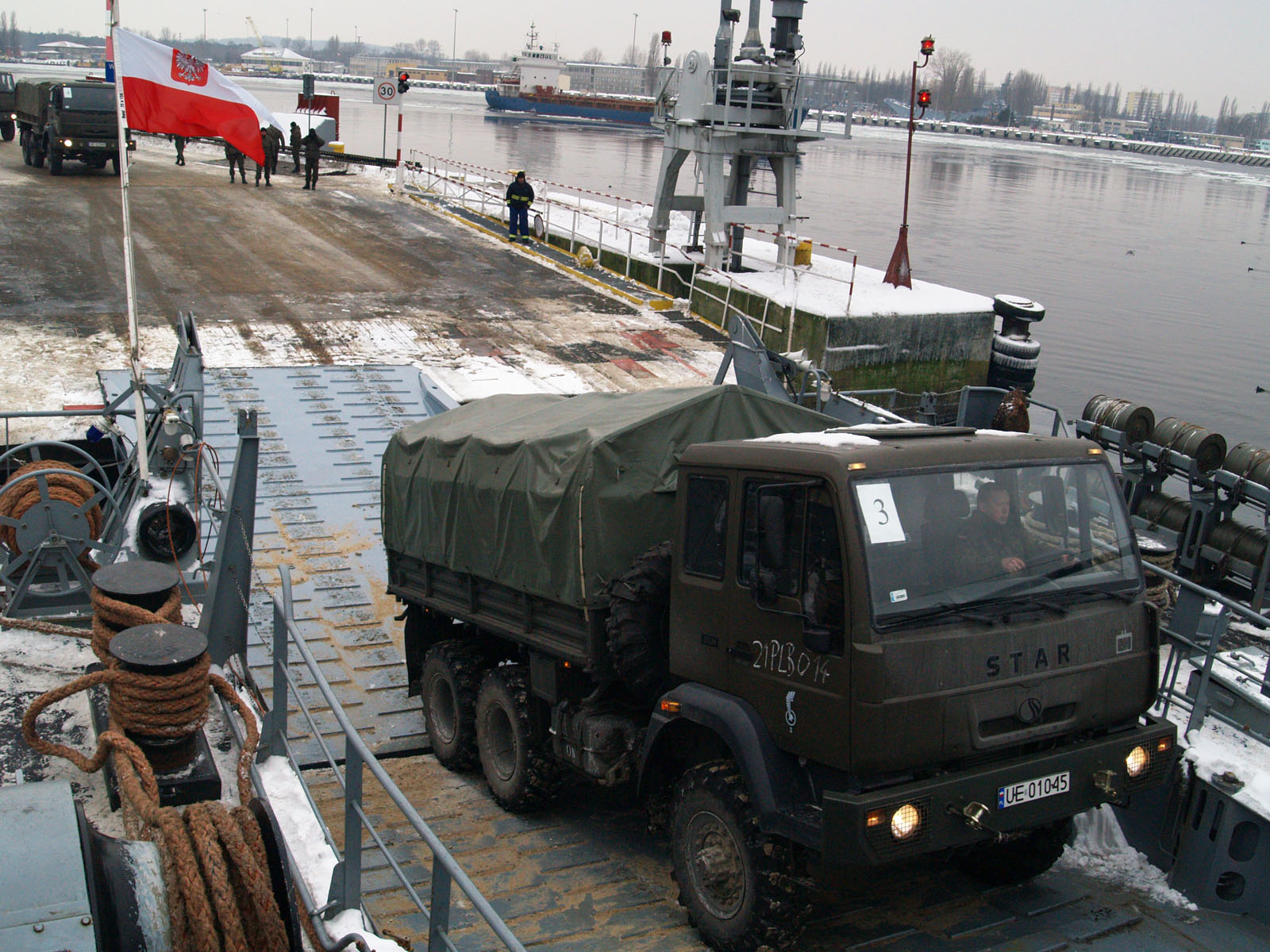
ORP Lublin on 22 January 2010.

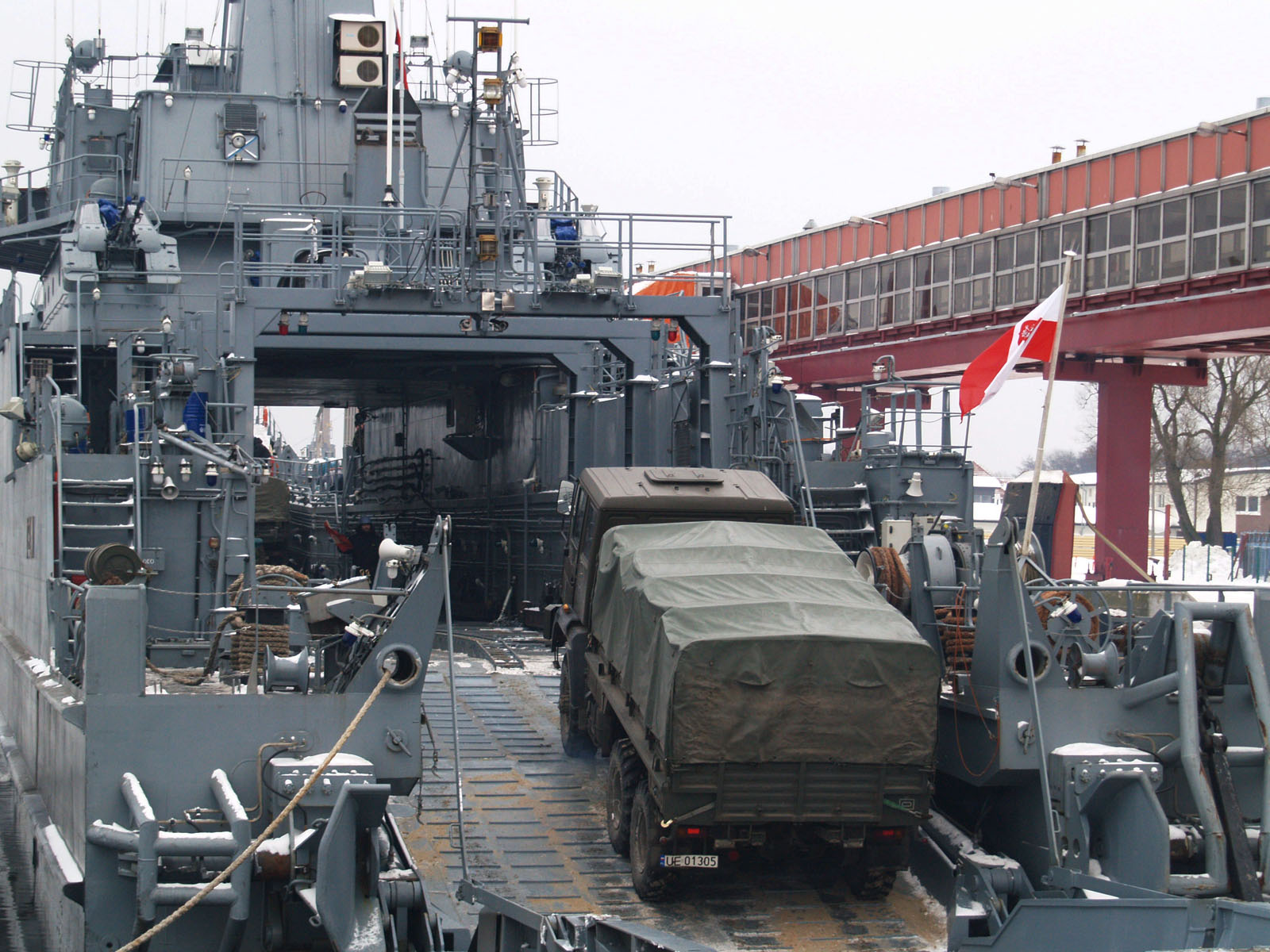
ORP Lublin on 22 January 2010.

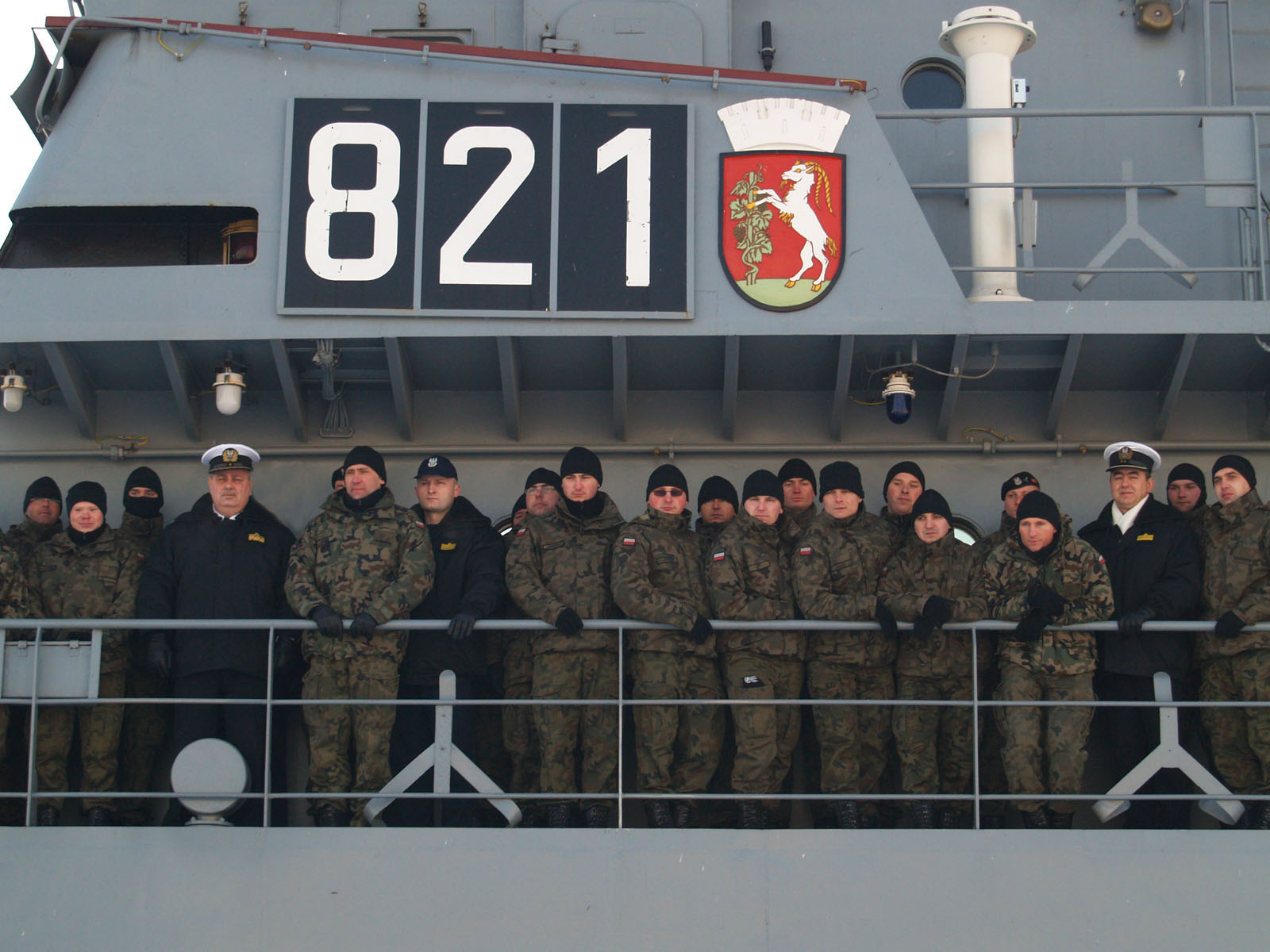
ORP Lublin on 22 January 2010.
