= ORP Poznań =

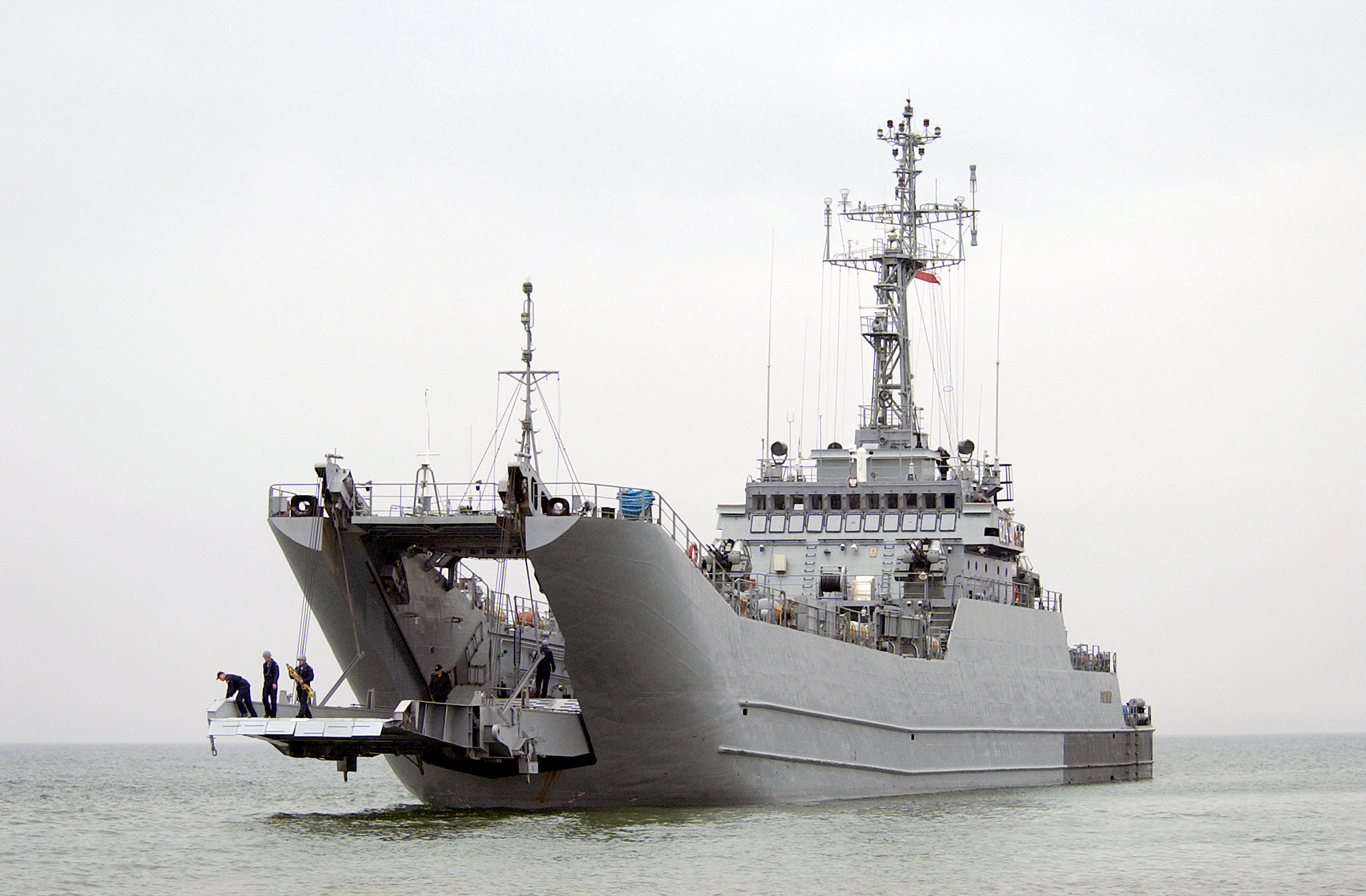
- ORP Poznań during BALTOPS 2004

History

Poland
- Name: Poznań
- Namesake: Poznań
- Laid down: 22 May 1989
- Launched: 5 January 1990
- Commissioned: 8 March 1991
- Identification: MMSI number: 261235000; Callsign: SOWD; Pennant number: 824
- Status: Active

General characteristics
- Class & type: Lublin-class minelayer-landing ship
- Tonnage: 1675 tones
- Length: 95.8 m (314 ft 4 in)
- Beam: 10.8 m (35 ft 5 in)
- Depth: 2.38 m (7 ft 10 in)
- Installed power: 3x Cegielski-Sulzer 6ATL25D 1320 kW each
- Speed: 16.5 knots
- Capacity: 9 landing vessels up to 45 tones each
- Complement: 51-56 crew
- Armament: 2 × ZU-23-2MR units composed of two 23 mm guns and two Strela-2M surface-to-air missile system; 9 × ŁWD 100/5000 launching tubes

ORP Poznań (824) is a Lublin-class minelayer-landing ship of the Polish Navy, named after the city of Poznań.

== Construction and career ==
The ship was commissioned on 8 March 1991 and incorporated into the 2nd Minelaying and Transport Unit of the 8th Coastal Defence Flotilla based in Świnoujście. This ship has taken part in several international exercises, including Strong Resolve 2002, Blue Game 2003, BALTOPS 2004, and BALTOPS 2005. While participating in Anakonda 2006, Poznań served as the flagship for the commander of the 8th Flotilla.

In 2003, on the 12th anniversary of Poznań's commissioning, a plaque bearing the city of Poznań's coat of arms was placed on the ship.

ORP Poznań sailed almost 60,000 nautical miles, twice won the title of the best unit of the 8th Coastal Defense Flotilla in Świnoujście, on March 8, 25 years have passed since Poznań first flag was raised.

== Gallery ==
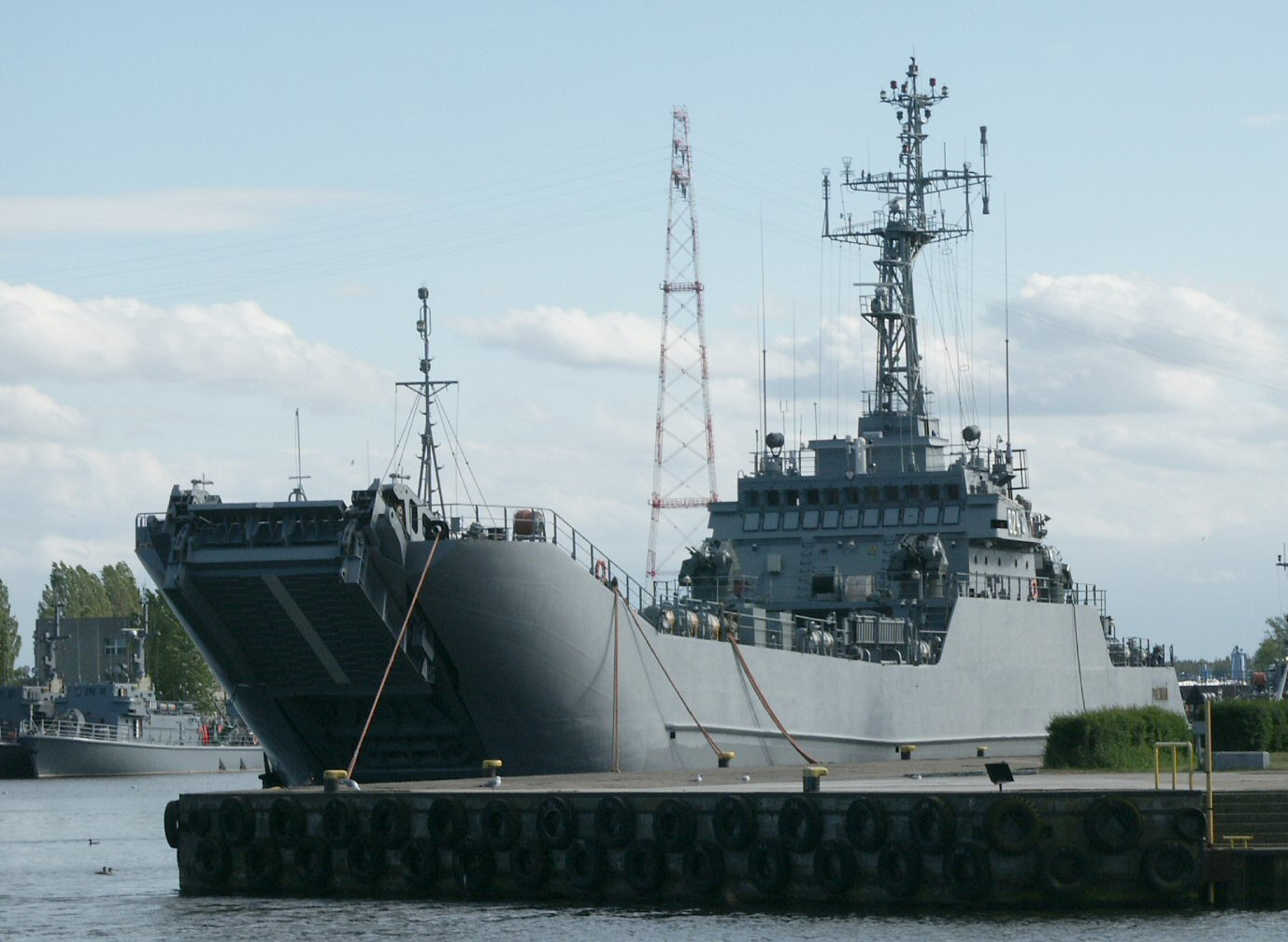
ORP Poznań in Swinoujscie in 2004.

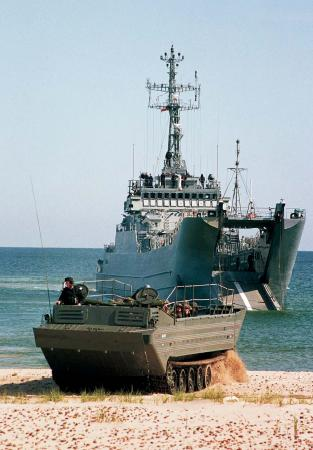
ORP Poznań in 2005.

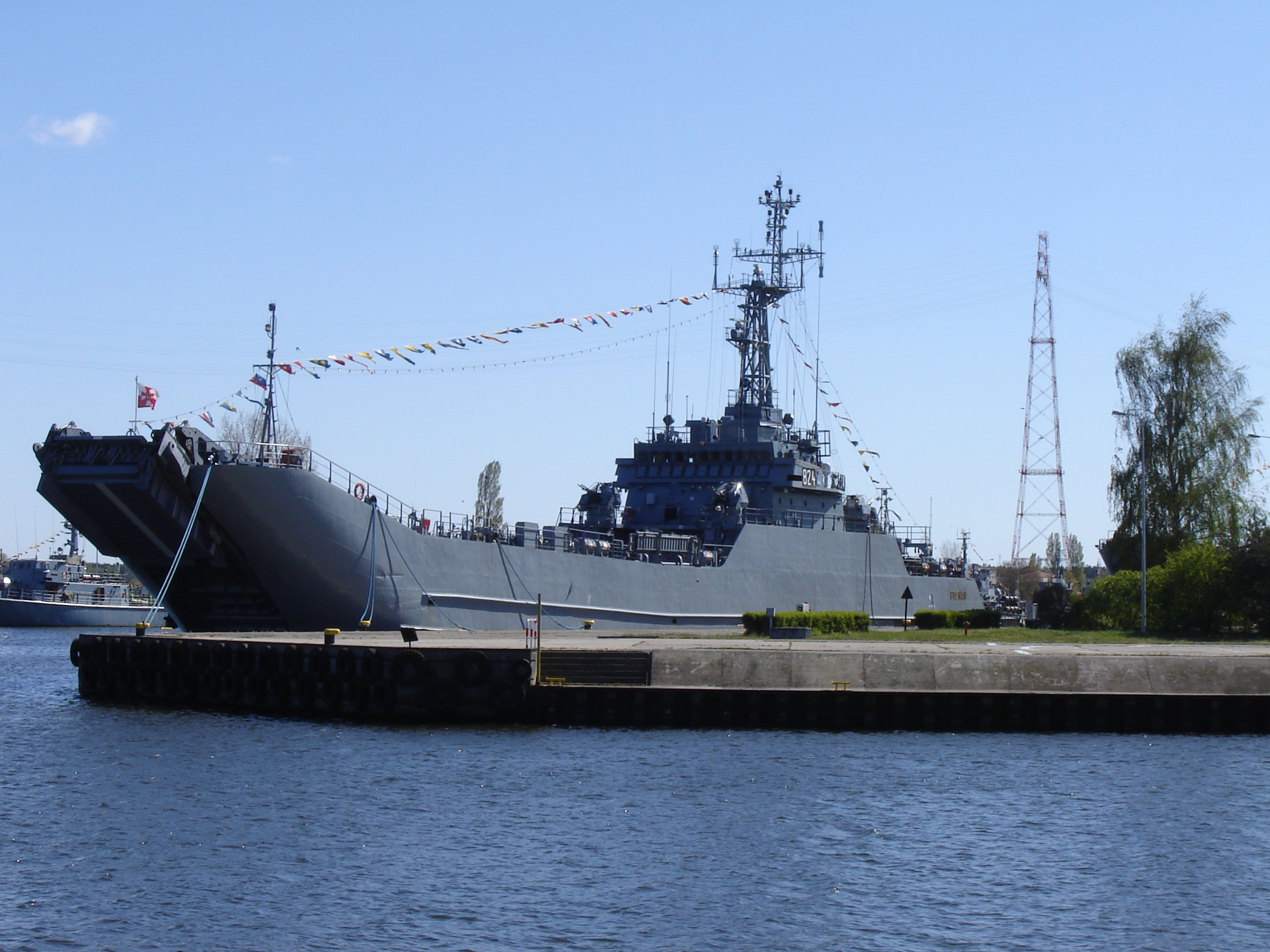
ORP Poznań in Swinoujscie in 2007.

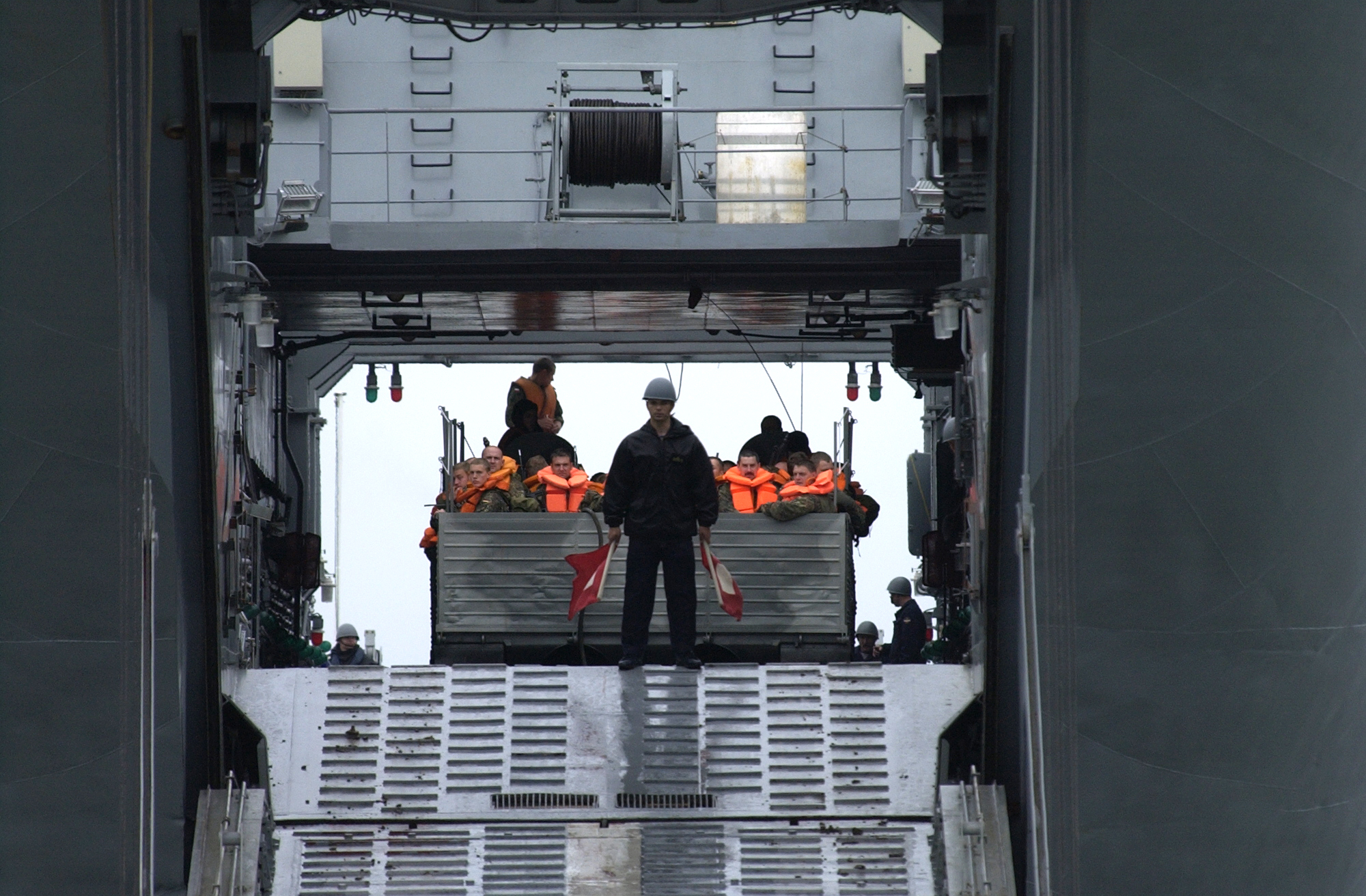
ORP Poznań during BALTOPS 2014.

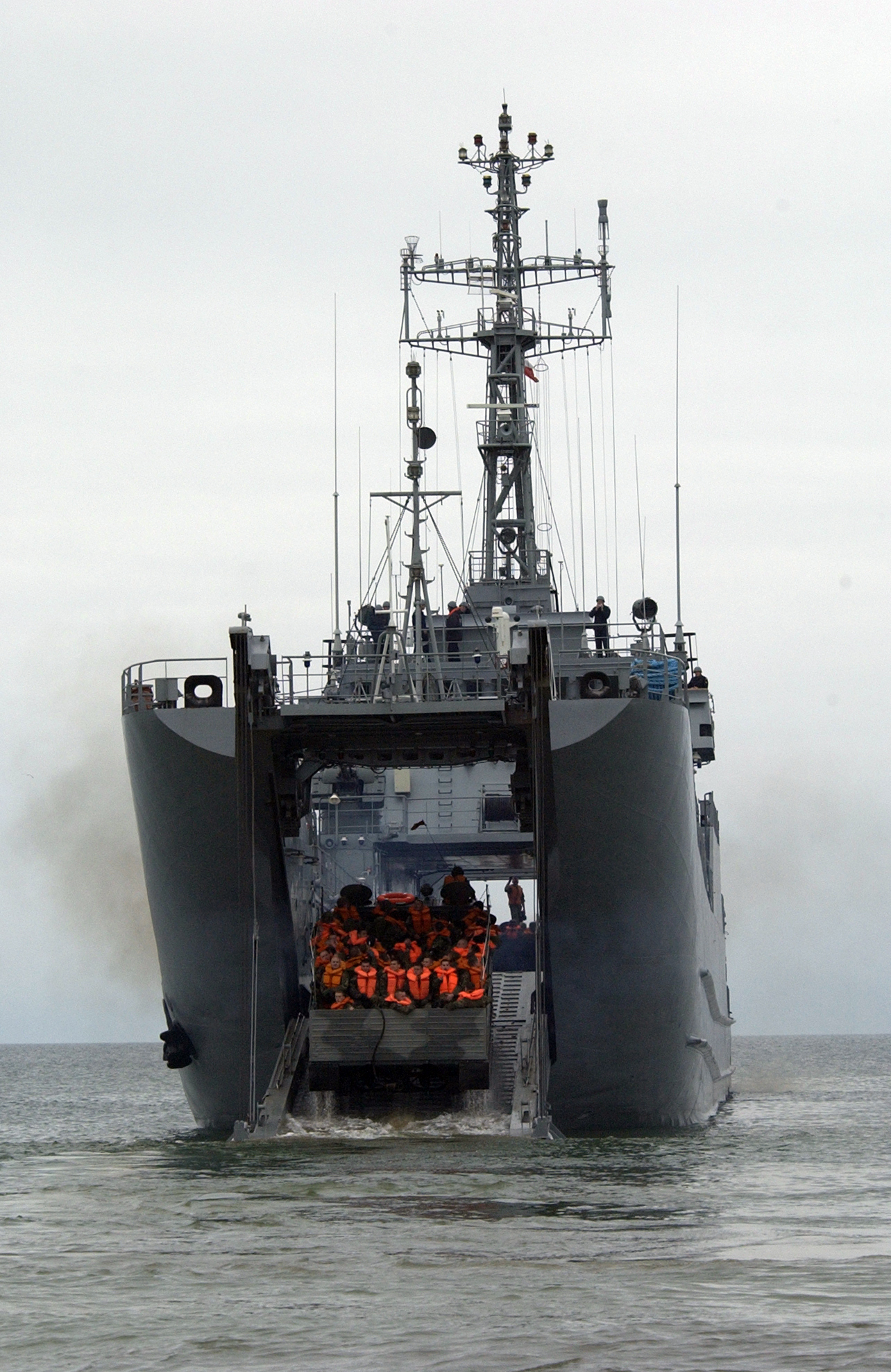
ORP Poznań during BALTOPS 2014.

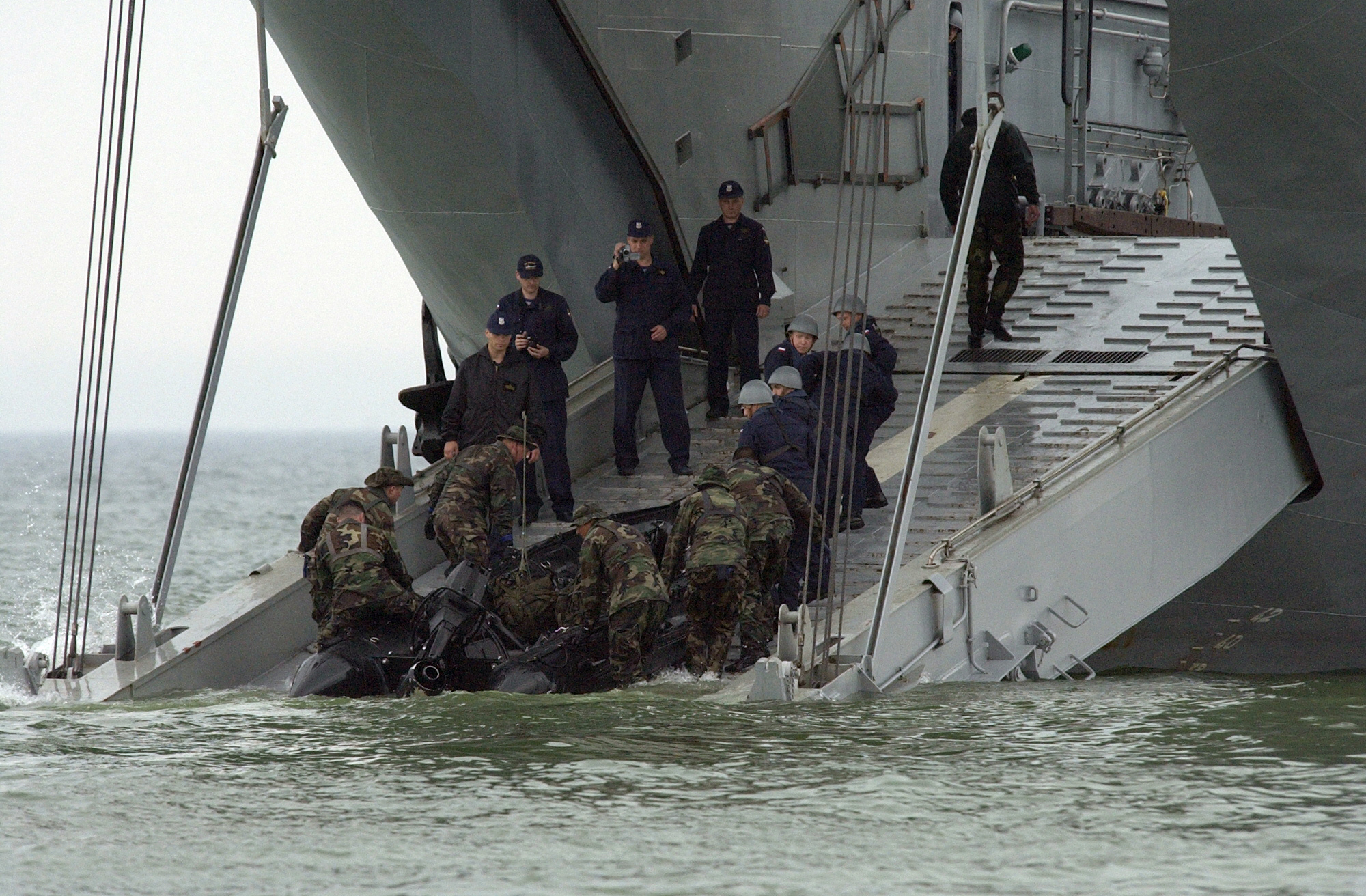
ORP Poznań during BALTOPS 2014.

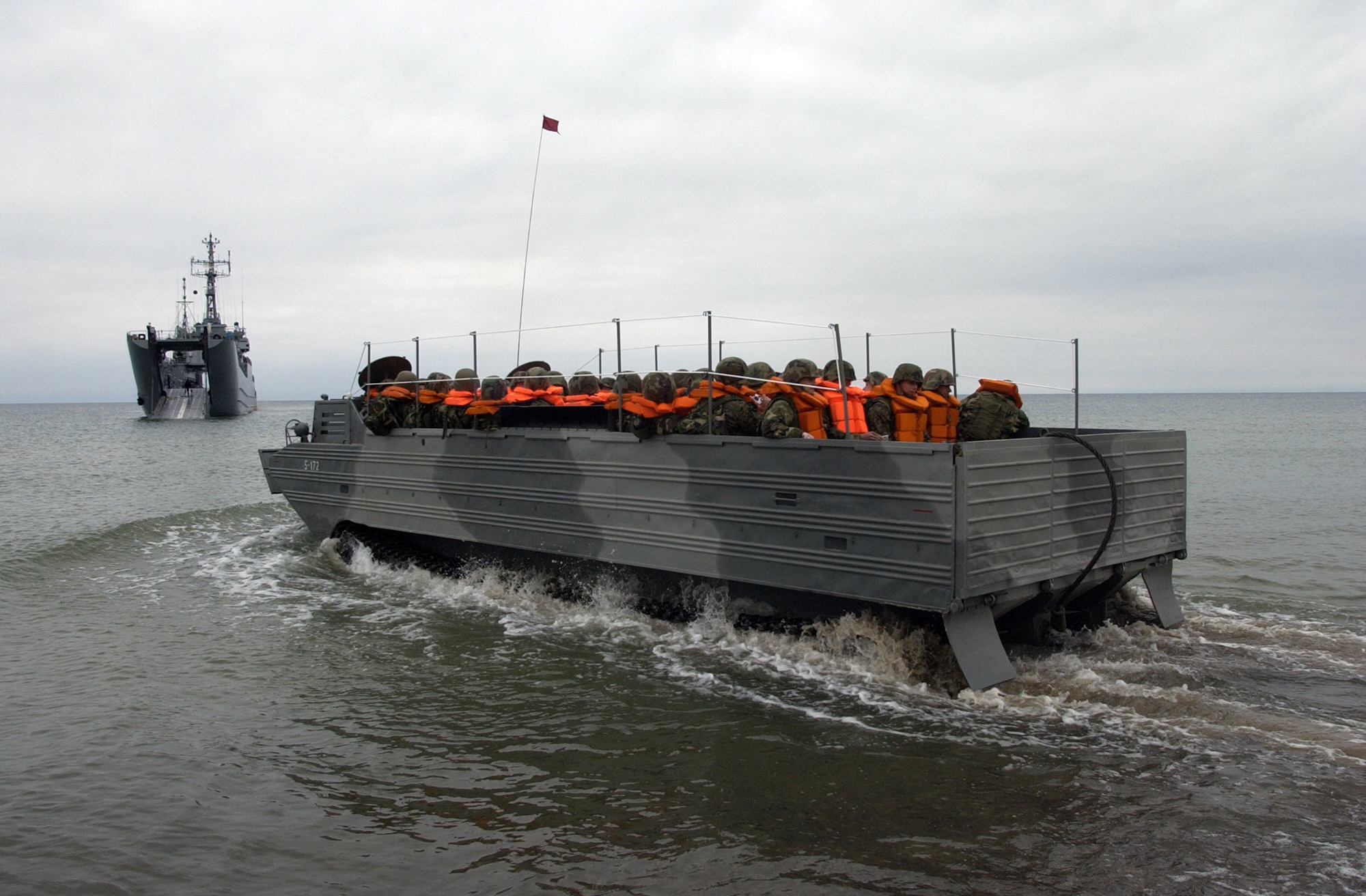
ORP Poznań during BALTOPS 2014.
