= ORP Kraków =

Lublin-class minelayer landing ship

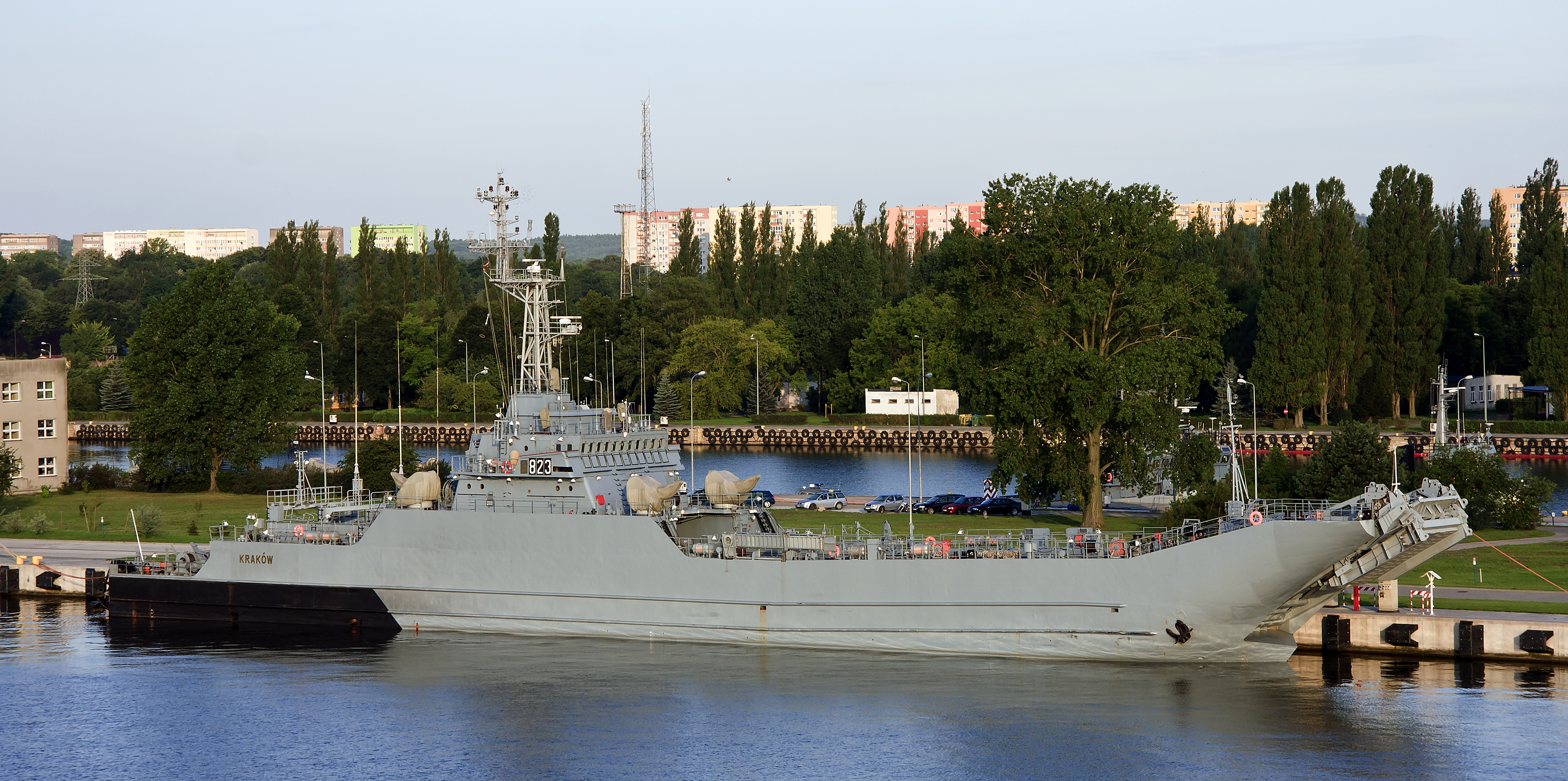
- ORP Kraków on 31 July 2012.

History

Poland
- Name: Kraków
- Namesake: Kraków
- Builder: Northern Shipyard, Gdańsk
- Laid down: 18 August 1988
- Launched: 7 March 1989
- Commissioned: 27 June 1990
- Identification: MMSI number: 261230000; Callsign: SOWE; Pennant number: 823
- Status: Active

General characteristics
- Class & type: Lublin-class minelayer-landing ship
- Tonnage: 1675 tones
- Length: 95.8 m (314 ft 4 in)
- Beam: 10.8 m (35 ft 5 in)
- Depth: 2.38 m (7 ft 10 in)
- Installed power: 3x Cegielski-Sulzer 6ATL25D 1320 kW each
- Speed: 16.5 knots
- Capacity: 9 landing vessels up to 45 tones each
- Armament: 2 × ZU-23-2MR units composed of two 23 mm guns and two Strela-2M surface-to-air missile system; 9 × ŁWD 100/5000 launching tubes

ORP Kraków (823) is a Lublin-class minelayer-landing ship of Polish Navy, named after the city of Kraków.

== Construction and career ==
The ship was built at the Northern Shipyard in Gdańsk. The main designer was MSc. Stanisław Keński. The keel was laid on 18 August 1988 and the ship was launched on 7 March 1989; the godmother is Mrs. Krystyna Rafa. The flag was raised on 27 June 1990.

ORP Kraków is the second ship in history to bear this name. The first was the river monitor, built in the Kraków shipyard of Fabryka Zieleniewski. She served in the years 1926-39.

== Gallery ==
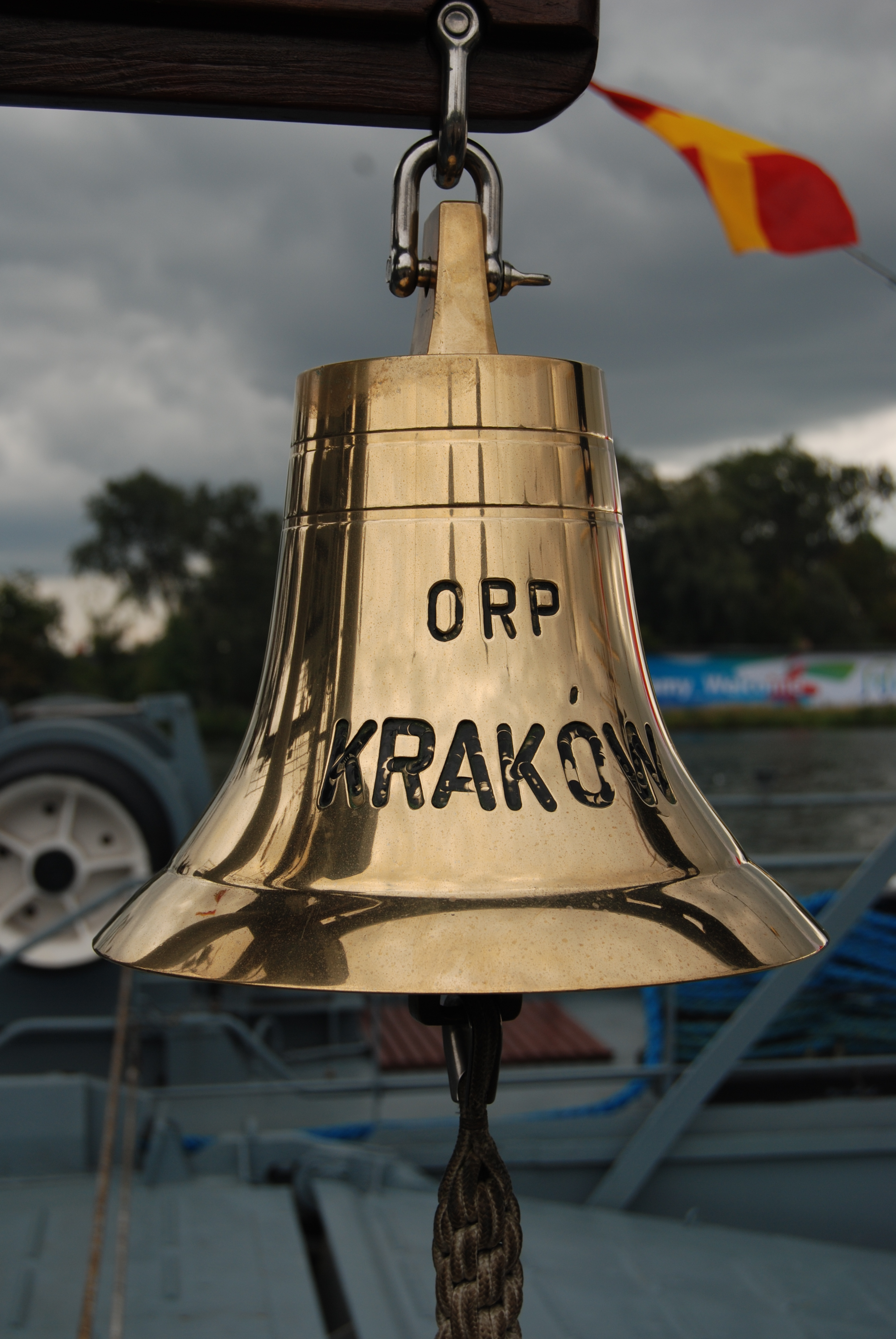
ORP Kraków’s bell

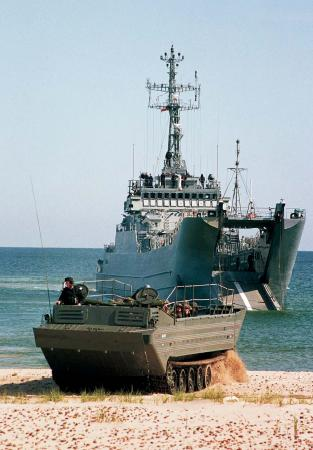
ORP Kraków during BALTOPS in August 2005.

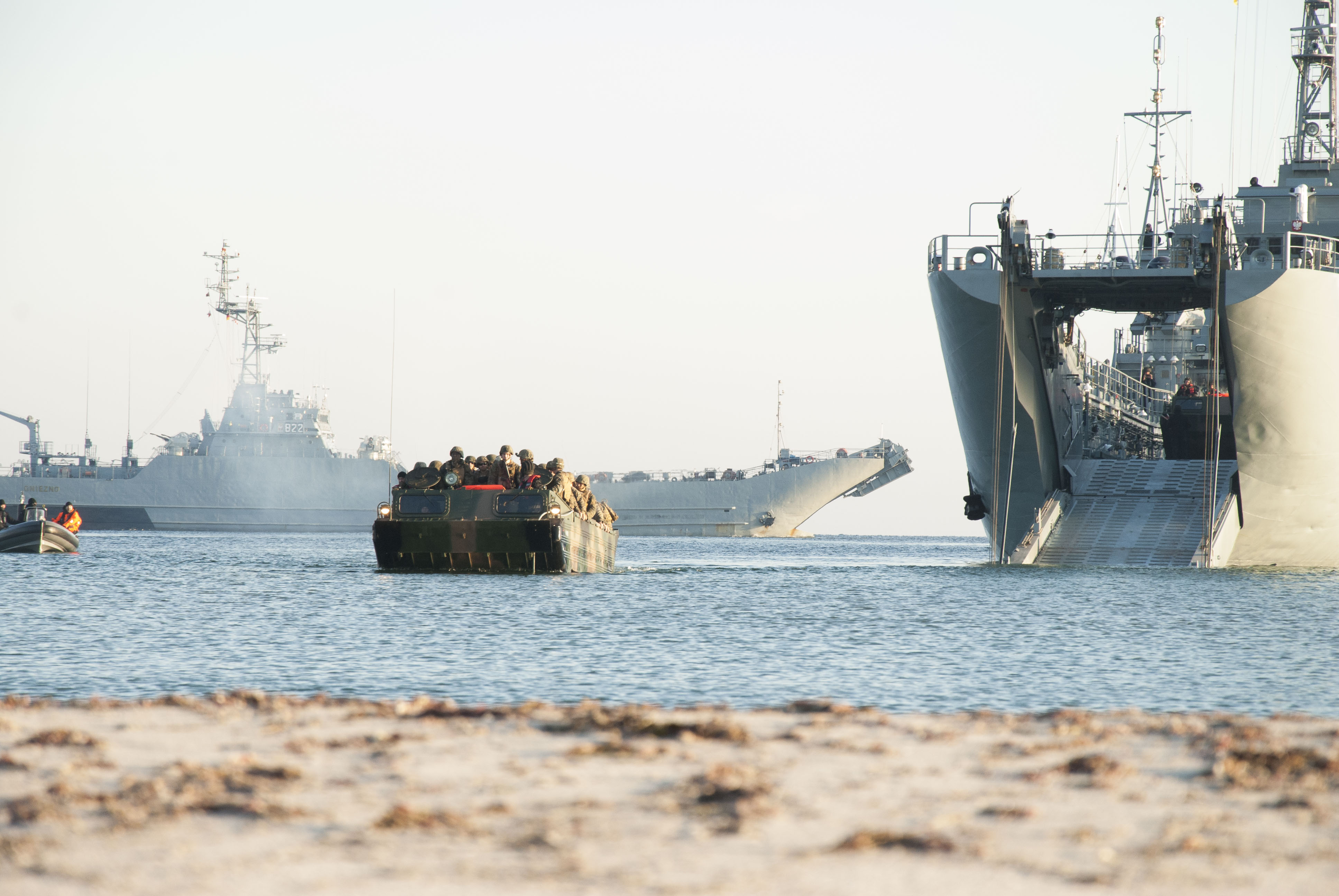
ORP Gniezno and ORP Kraków during BALTOPS 2017.

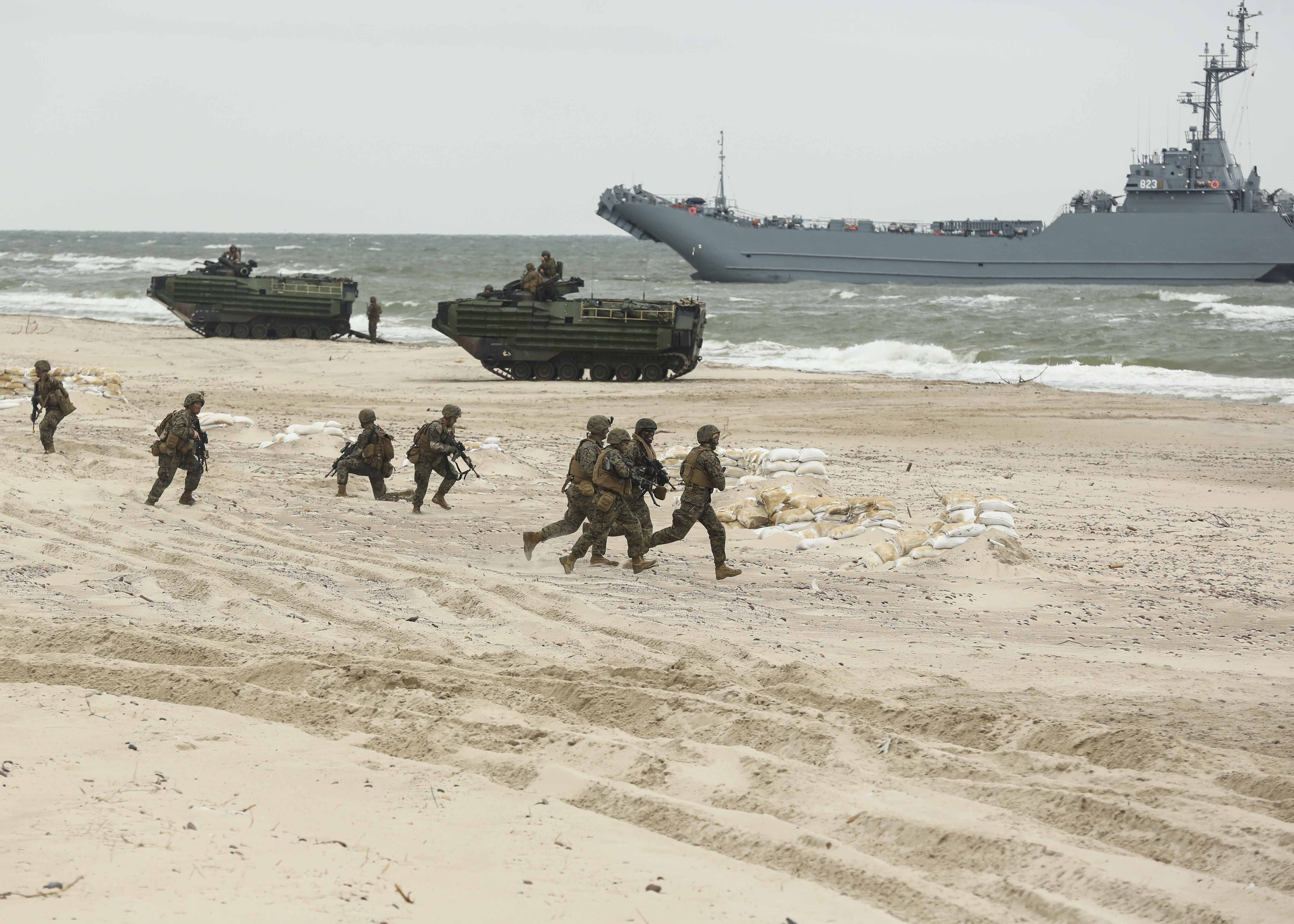
ORP Kraków during BALTOPS 2017.

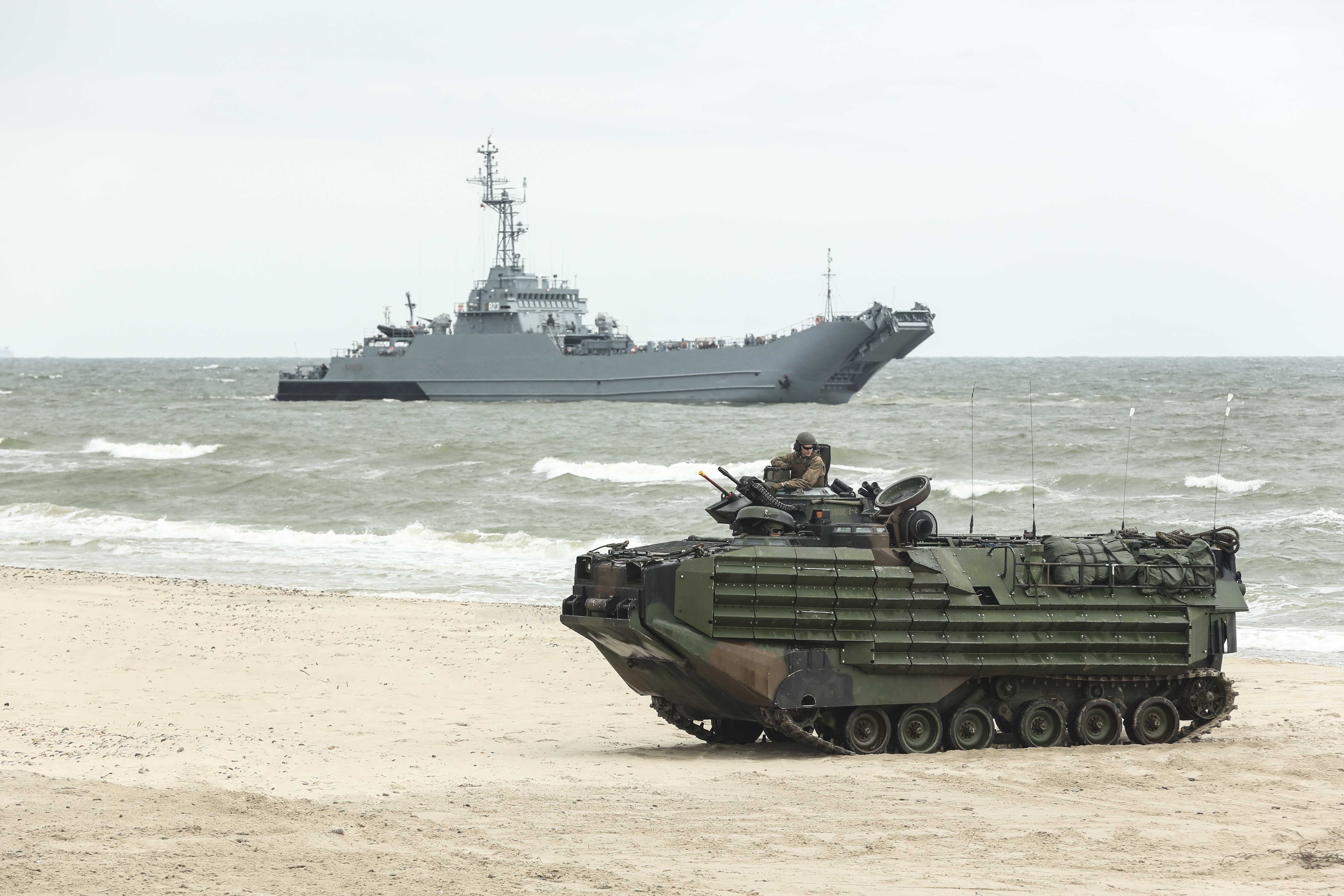
ORP Kraków during BALTOPS 2017.

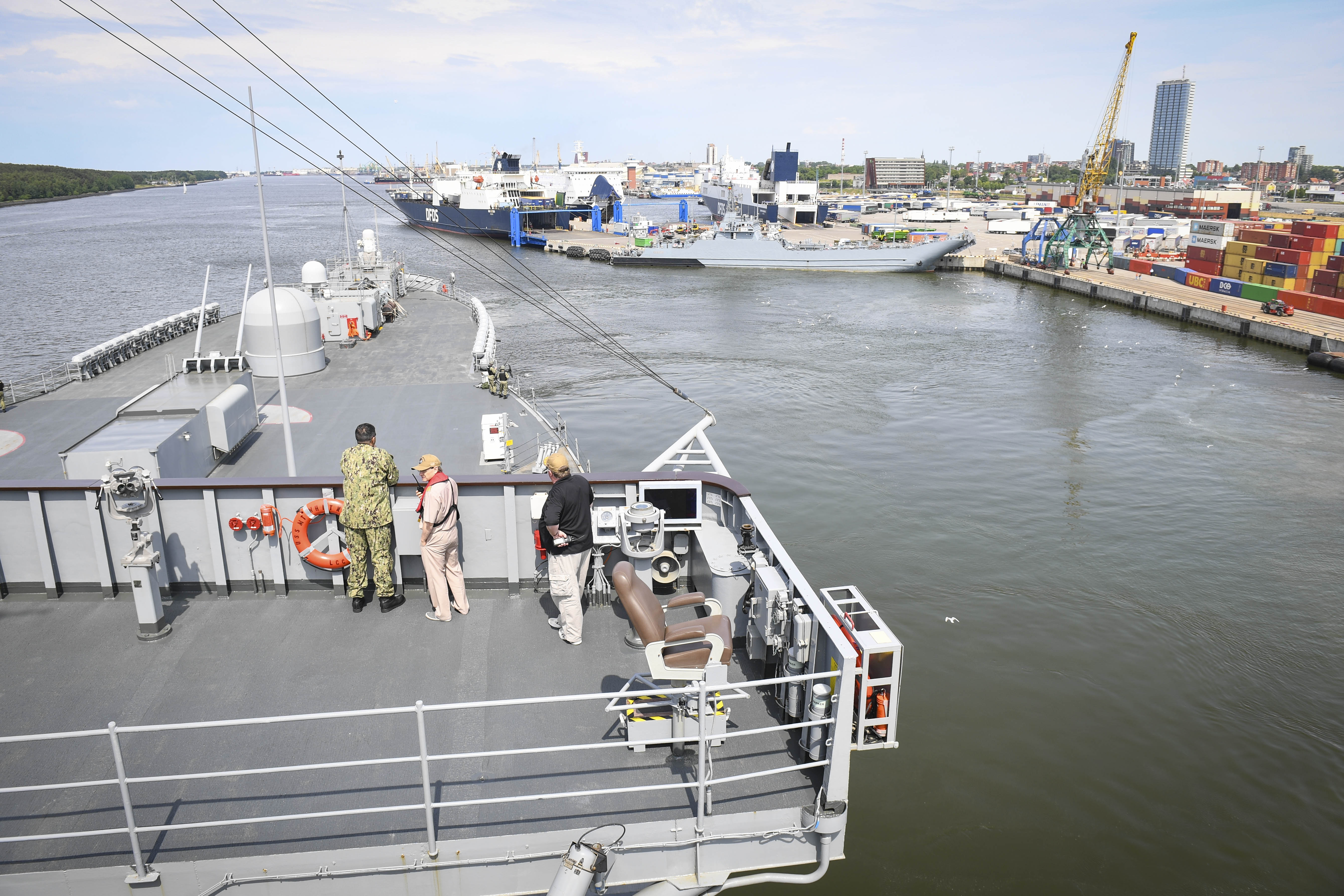
USS Mount Whitney departs Klaipeda, Lithuania with ORP Kraków on 3 June 2018.

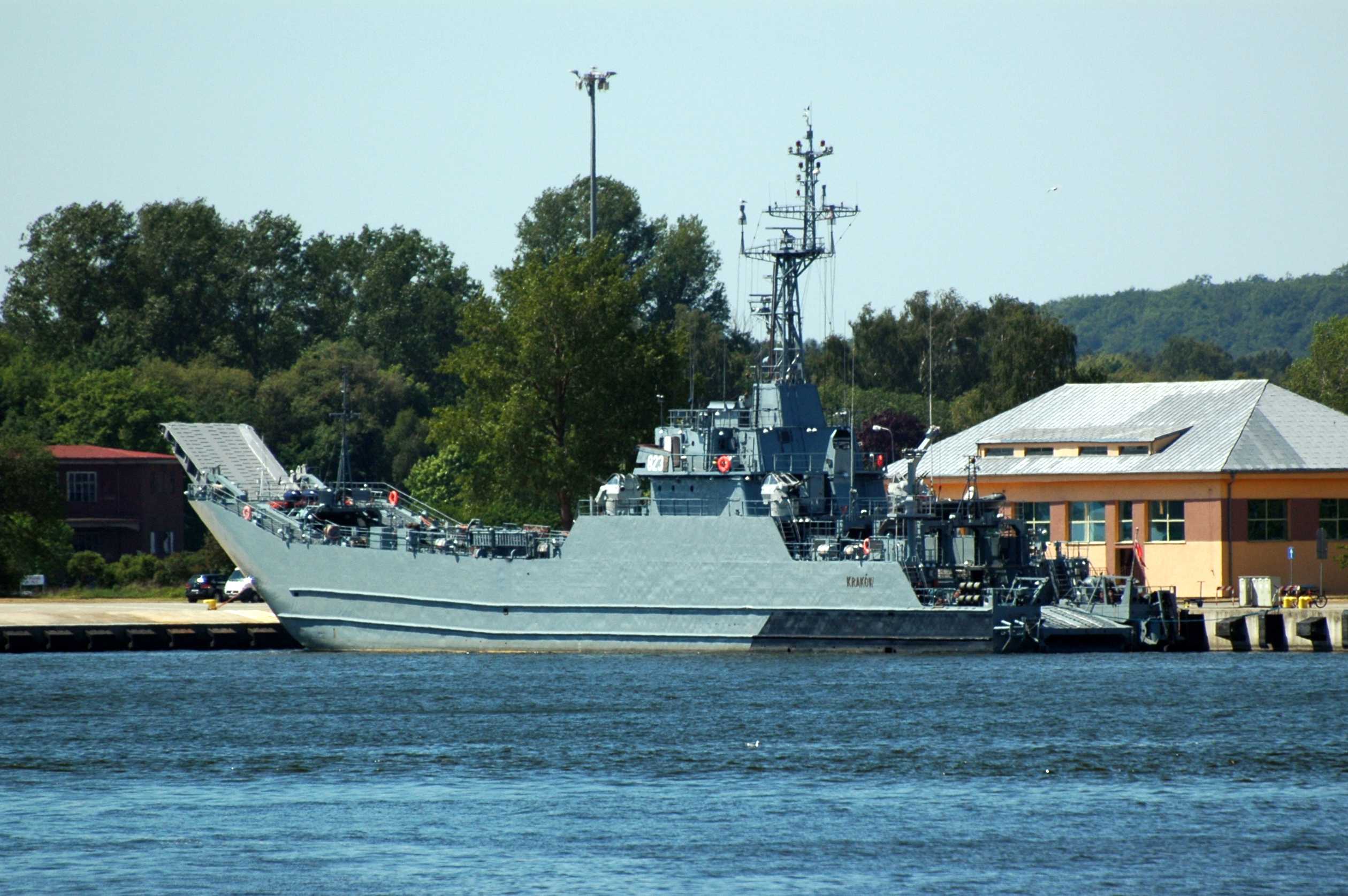
ORP Kraków at Świnoujście on 29 May 2018.
