= ORP Toruń =

Lublin-class minelayer landing ship

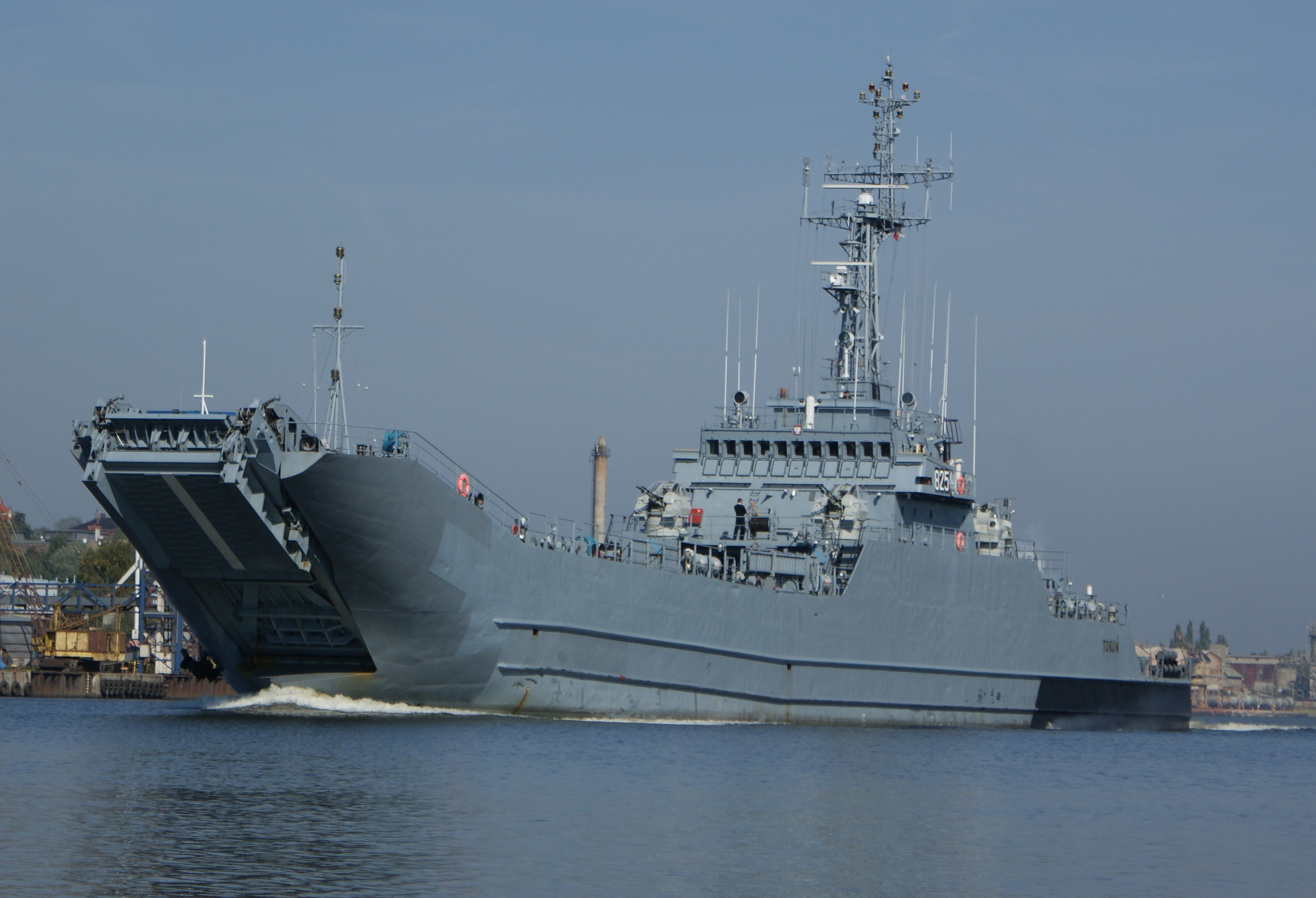
- ORP Toruń at Świnoujście on 23 September 2010.

History

Poland
- Name: Toruń
- Namesake: Toruń
- Builder: Northern Shipyard, Gdańsk
- Laid down: 21 August 1989
- Launched: 8 June 1990
- Commissioned: 24 May 1991
- Identification: MMSI number: 261228000; Callsign: SOWF; Pennant number: 825
- Status: Active

General characteristics
- Class & type: Lublin-class minelayer-landing ship
- Tonnage: 1675 tones
- Length: 95.8 m (314 ft 4 in)
- Beam: 10.8 m (35 ft 5 in)
- Depth: 2.38 m (7 ft 10 in)
- Installed power: 3x Cegielski-Sulzer 6ATL25D 1320 kW each
- Speed: 16.5 knots
- Capacity: 9 landing vessels up to 45 tones each
- Armament: 2 × ZU-23-2MR units composed of two 23 mm guns and two Strela-2M surface-to-air missile system; 9 × ŁWD 100/5000 launching tubes

ORP Toruń (825) is a Lublin-class minelayer-landing ship of Polish Navy, named after the city of Toruń.

== Construction and career ==
The flag was raised on 24 May 1991. The ship is part of the 2nd Transport and Mine Ship Squadron in Świnoujście, belonging to the 8th Coastal Defense Flotilla. The ship is intended for transporting landing troops with equipment and vehicles, setting sea mines (takes 130 minutes at a time) and evacuating people.

== Gallery ==
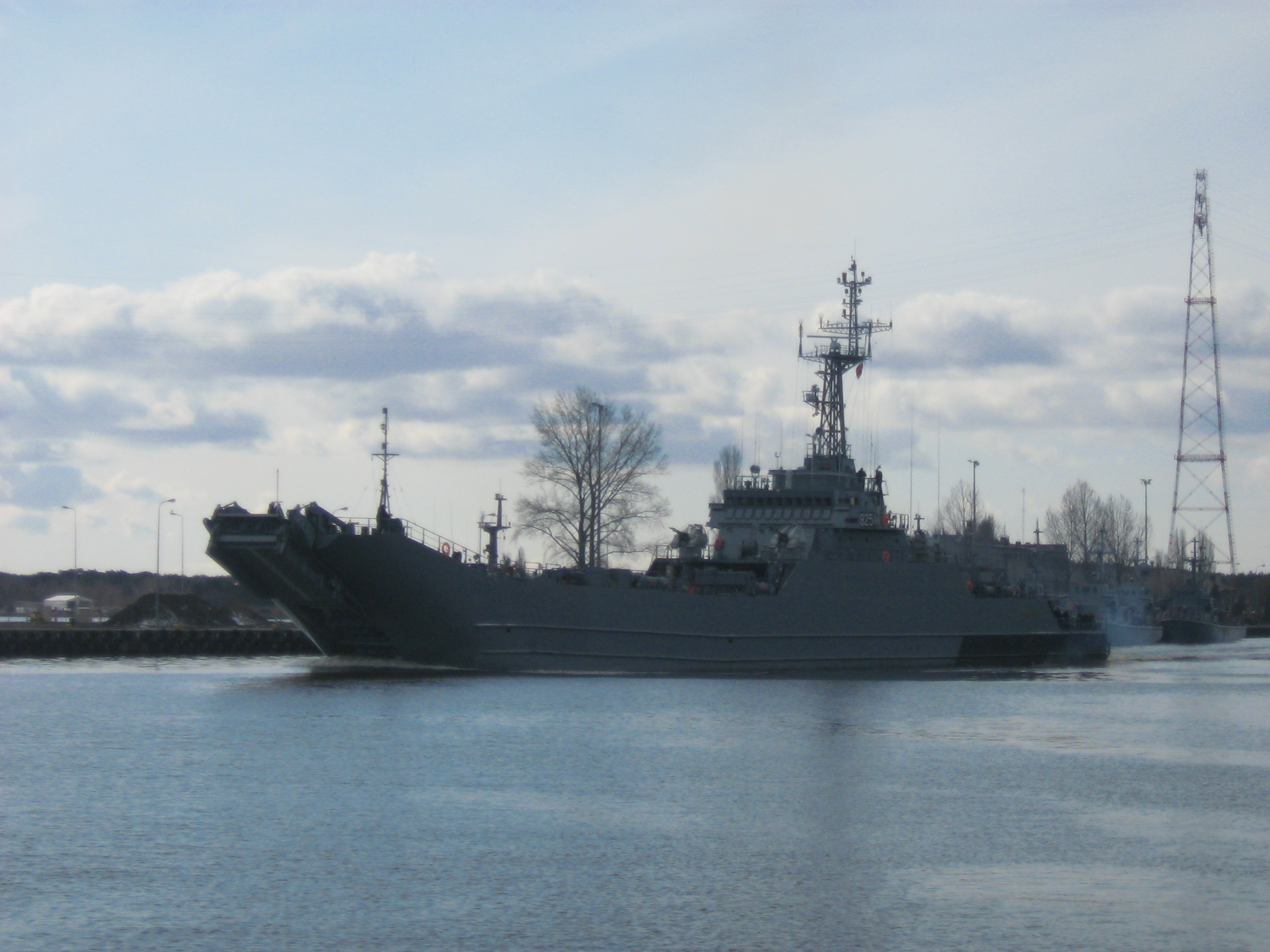
ORP Toruń at Świnoujście on 25 March 2009.

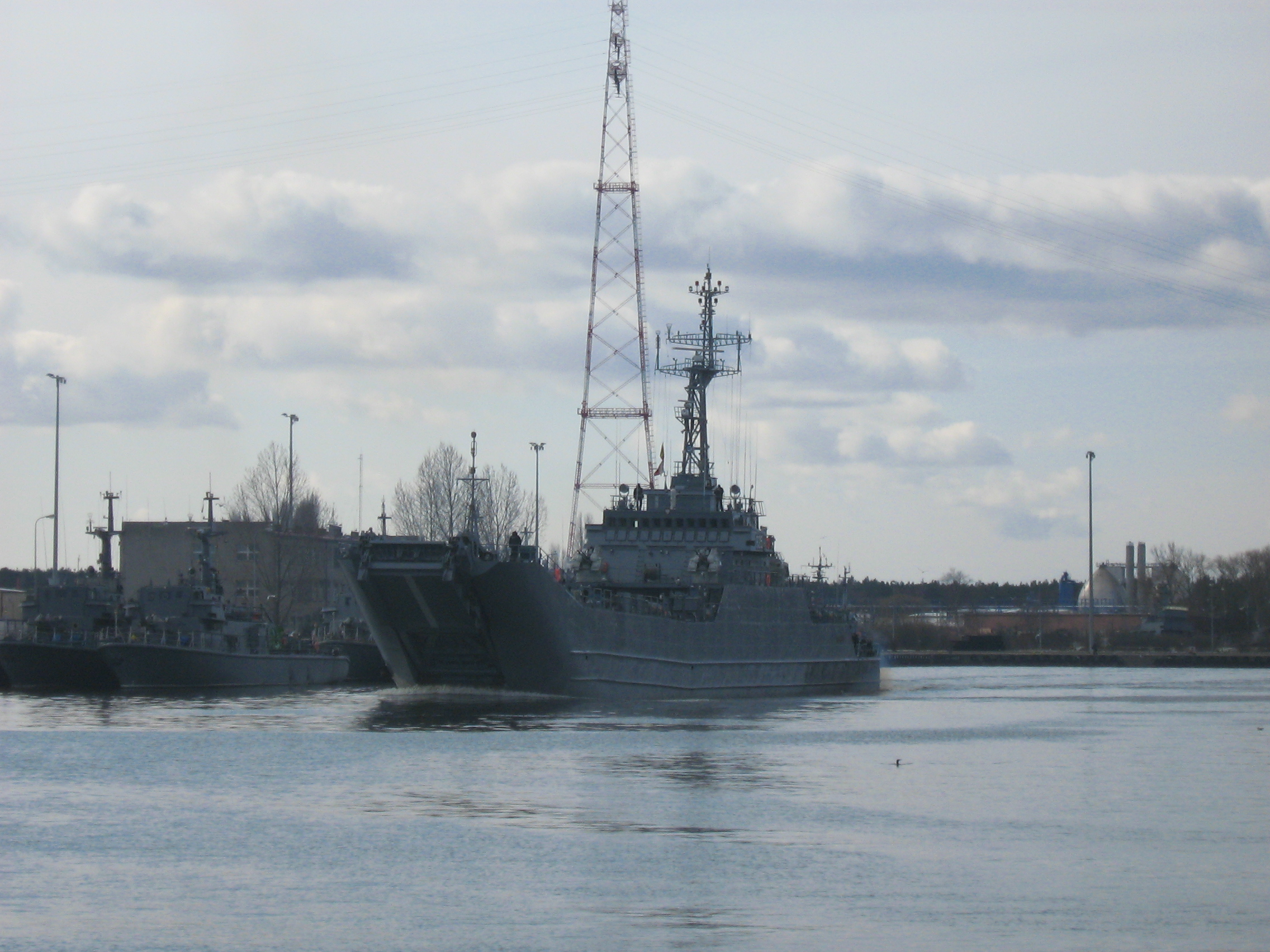
ORP Toruń at Świnoujście on 25 March 2009.

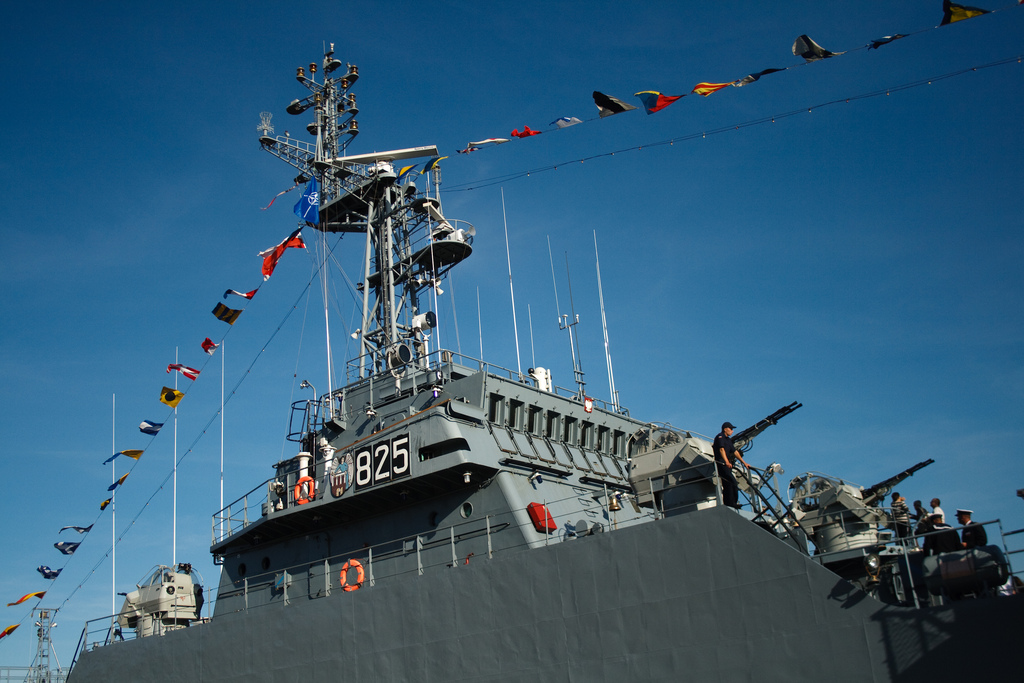
ORP Toruń on 19 September 2009.
