= ORP Generał Sikorski =

Polish riverine staff vessel and anti-aircraft defense ship

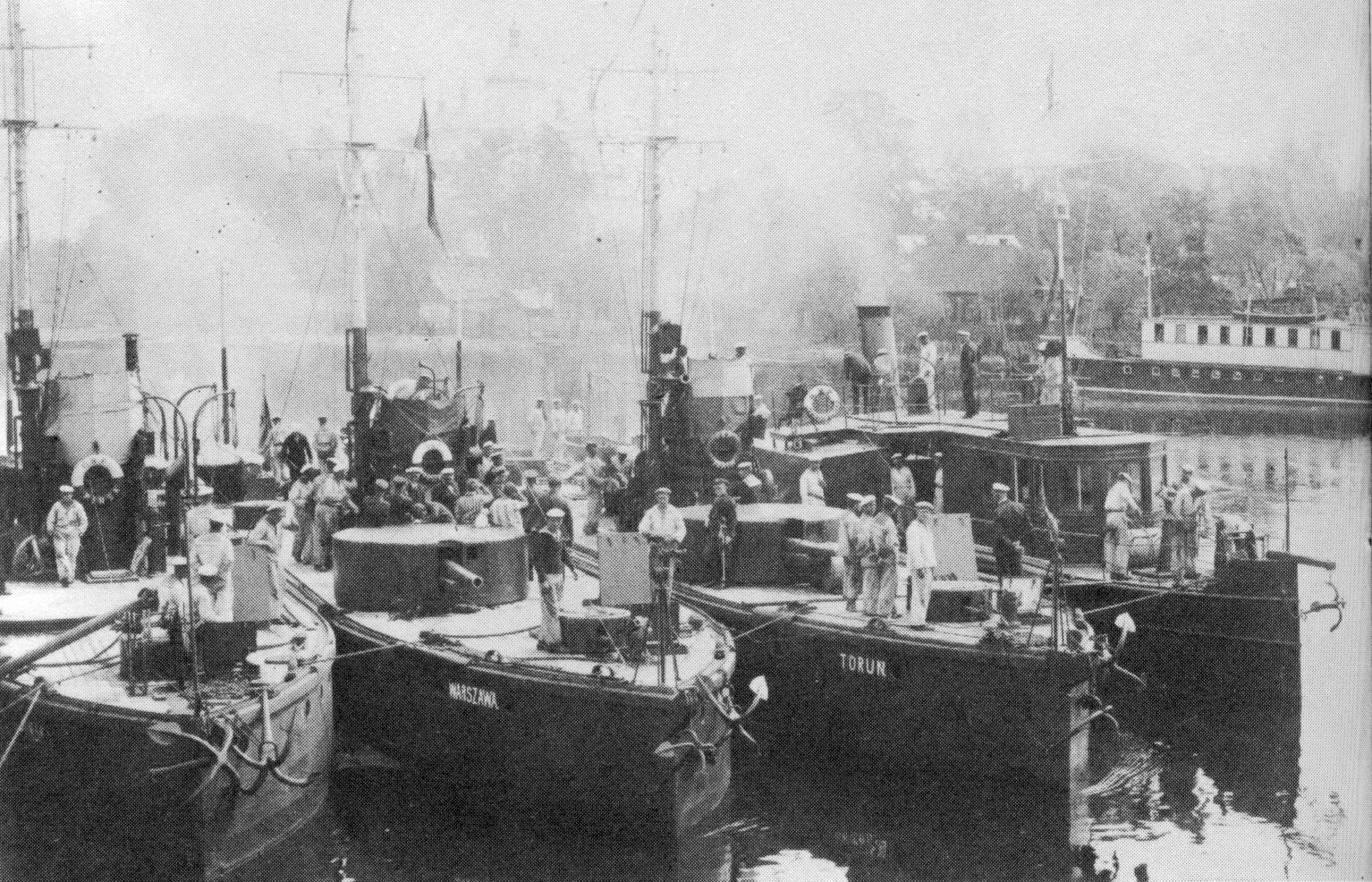
- ORP Generał Sikorski (on the right)

History

Soviet Union
- Name: Pierieval
- Commissioned: 1919
- Decommissioned: 1920

History

Second Polish Republic
- Name: D 2 → Pułkownik Sikorski → Generał Sikorski
- Commissioned: March 1920
- Decommissioned: September 18, 1939

History

Soviet Union
- Name: Bug
- Commissioned: 1940
- Fate: sunk in July 1941

General characteristics
- Type: staff ship/anti-aircraft defense vessel
- Displacement: 54 t (53 long tons)
- Length: 30.5 m (100 ft 1 in)
- Beam: 3.6 m (11 ft 10 in)
- Draft: 0.55 m (1 ft 10 in)
- Propulsion: 1 steam engine, 65 hp; sidewheel paddle steamer
- Speed: 14 km/h (8.7 mph)
- Complement: 19
- Armament: 2 heavy machine guns, 13.2 mm caliber; 2 medium machine guns, 7.92 mm caliber

ORP Generał Sikorski (formerly D 2, originally Pułkownik Sikorski) was a Polish riverine staff vessel and anti-aircraft defense ship, originally a Russian steamship named Pierieval. It served in the Riverine Flotilla of the Polish Navy from March 1920 until September 1939. The ship was named in honor of Colonel Władysław Sikorski, then commander of the 9th Infantry Division, whose actions in March 1920 led to the capture of Pierieval and other vessels of the Dnieper Flotilla. During its service under the Polish flag, it was scuttled twice: in July 1920 and again in September 1939. Later salvaged by the Soviets, it was incorporated into the Dnieper Flotilla under the name Bug and was sunk in July 1941 on the Danube.

== History ==
=== Polish-Soviet war ===
Originally a Russian cargo-passenger steamship named Pierieval, the vessel was constructed in 1916. From July 1919, it was part of the Soviet Dnieper Flotilla under the Russian Soviet Federative Socialist Republic. On 5 March 1920, soldiers of the 9th Infantry Division, led by Colonel Władysław Sikorski, captured the vessel in a seaworthy condition during operations in Mazyr. Subsequently transferred to the Riverine Flotilla of the Polish Navy by Sikorski, (Note: At that time, the Riverine Flotilla of the Polish Navy was under the command of the 9th Infantry Division (Dyskant (1994, p. 78)).) it was commissioned on 18 March 1920 by shipyard workers from the Taura repair facility, receiving the designation D 2.

Shortly thereafter, the sidewheeler became the command ship of the Polesie Group, renamed Pułkownik Sikorski in honor of the 9th Infantry Division's commander. During the Kiev offensive, it served as an inspection vessel for the 9th Infantry Division's staff. As Polish forces retreated, the ship was stripped of equipment and scuttled with explosives on 25 July 1920, along with several other vessels, on the Pina river near Pinsk. Low water levels on the Pripyat river and the Dnieper–Bug Canal prevented its withdrawal. The crews of the scuttled ships were evacuated via Brest to Toruń, joining the Vistula Flotilla after the Riverine Flotilla of the Polish Navy's dissolution. The Soviets later salvaged the vessel, towed it to the Mosty Wolanskie area, and sank it during their retreat from Polesie.

=== Interwar period ===
Following the reoccupation of Polesie, Pułkownik Sikorski was raised in October 1920 and underwent a successful technical inspection in 1921 by a commission appointed by the Department of Maritime Affairs. In 1922, it was assigned to the reestablished Riverine Flotilla of the Polish Navy. In April 1922, the vessel was renamed Generał Sikorski and resumed its role as an armed command ship. (Note: The initial staff of the Riverine Flotilla of the Polish Navy included flag officer Ensign Bogusław Lewicki, artillery officer Captain Lieutenant Ryszard Reyman, and technical service chief Lieutenant Commander Engineer Wacław Żejma (Dyskant (1994, p. 98)).) By mid-July 1922, Captain Lieutenant Karol Taube assumed command, leading a crew of 25 non-commissioned officers and sailors. After a radiotelegraph station opened in Pinsk in July 1923, the ship's staff was augmented by a radio officer, Acting Chief Boatswain Włodzimierz Dułyk.

In May 1924, Lieutenant Jerzy Kubańczyk took command, with Reserve Lieutenant Teodor Rudziński as his deputy. A refit began in June 1925 at the Pinsk port workshops. From 30 October 1925, the ship was placed in preservation with a skeleton crew. It actively participated in the 1926 and 1927 campaigns. In April 1927, Michman Alfons Połomski commanded the vessel, with a crew of 16. In August 1927, ORP Generał Sikorski was reassigned from the Flotilla Commander's Group to the Communications Group as a base ship, hosting the Pinsk radio station personnel. On 31 August 1927, it was placed in reserve for conversion into an armed vessel and, by May 1928, joined the 1st Combat Squadron. (Note: The Communications Group's base ship role was transferred to ORP Admirał Dickman (Dyskant (1994, p. 121)).) Its armament consisted of two 37 mm naval guns, manned by a crew of two officers and 25 sailors.

The 1929 summer campaign began on 1 May, with the ship likely fitted with removable armor developed between 1926 and 1927 by the Flotilla's port workshop design office. From 1930 to 1931, it remained in the 1st Squadron alongside the monitors ORP Wilno and ORP Kraków. On 1 January 1932, Sub-Lieutenant Tadeusz Borysiewicz, the ship's commander, was promoted to Lieutenant. The vessel actively participated in the 1932 and 1933 campaigns within the 1st Combat Squadron.

Between 1933 and 1934, ORP Generał Sikorski was converted into an anti-aircraft defense ship, rearmed with heavy machine guns and medium machine guns on anti-aircraft mounts. In August 1934, Lieutenant Antoni Kramer commanded the ship, with Piotr Rymanowicz as boatswain. The 1st Combat Squadron's command was also embarked, including Captain Roman Kanafoyski (commander), Captain Jerzy Marx (artillery officer), and Sub-Lieutenant Zygmunt Jasiński (engineer officer). In 1935, the ship resumed service on 1 May and concluded on 1 October. In 1936, Lieutenant Narcyz Małuszyński commanded the vessel until his promotion to Minelaying-Gas Unit commander on 16 November. It participated in the 1937 campaign but was placed in reserve on 1 September for cost-saving reasons. (Note: Borowiak (2014, p. 45) states it was reserved between September and October 1937.)

=== Mobilization and September Campaign ===
Following Nazi Germany's territorial and political demands on Poland in spring 1939, a partial mobilization of the Riverine Flotilla of the Polish Navy, including Generał Sikorski, was ordered on 23 March. After Poland rejected the demands, the war alert was lifted on 26 March. A second mobilization was declared on 27 August 1939 and executed smoothly, as the ships were already active in the summer campaign. With weak ground anti-aircraft defenses, the flotilla's ships, including Generał Sikorski, were tasked with base protection. The vessels were repositioned near Pinsk, camouflaged with irregular black, dark brown, and gray patches on a dull green background.

At the outbreak of World War II, the ship remained in the 1st Combat Squadron under Reserve Sub-Lieutenant Ludwik Fidosz. After Germany's attack on Poland, it took up a firing position near Mosty Wolańskie, where the water depth was sufficient over a 4-kilometer stretch. Facing the threat of Luftwaffe bombardment, Flotilla Captain Witold Zajączkowski formed the Mosty Wolańskie Anti-Aircraft Defense Detachment on 3 or 4 September, comprising Generał Sikorski and ORP Hetman Chodkiewicz. On 6–7 September, German aircraft dropped 30 bombs without success, while the ship's defenses downed two planes. Further Luftwaffe raids were repelled in the following days, with reports claiming several enemy aircraft were shot down. (Note: Unconfirmed reports suggest Generał Sikorski gunners downed several aircraft (Borowiak (2014, p. 46)).)

On 13 September, the ships defending Mosty Wolańskie joined the Mosty Wolańskie Subsection of the Independent Operational Group Polesie, commanded by Commander Lieutenant Stefan Kamiński, tasked with supporting the Border Protection Corps in defending the crossing and securing their retreat across the Pripyat. Luftwaffe bombings on 14 and 16 September were ineffective. After the Soviet invasion of Poland, General Franciszek Kleeberg, commander of the Independent Operational Group Polesie, ordered the destruction and scuttling of the Riverine Flotilla of the Polish Navy's vessels on 17 September due to low water levels preventing evacuation. On 18 September, Generał Sikorski was scuttled east of Mosty Wolańskie after its armament and ammunition were removed, though its superstructure remained above water due to shallow depths.

=== Service in the Soviet Fleet ===
The ship was salvaged by the Dnieper Flotilla's emergency rescue service, aided by EPRON specialists, by 12 November 1939. After repairs in Kyiv, it joined the Dnieper Flotilla as Bug, serving as an independent floating base from mid-1940. It was later transferred to the Danube Flotilla as a command ship. Following Germany's invasion of the Soviet Union, Bug was sunk in July 1941 on the Danube.

== Technical specifications ==
Generał Sikorski was a riverine vessel with a length between perpendiculars of 30.5 meters, a beam of 3.6 meters, and a draft of 0.55 meters. (Note: Borowiak (2014, p. 46) notes an overall length of 32 meters and a draft up to 0.7 meters.) Its displacement was 54 tonnes. Powered by a double-expansion steam engine rated at 65 horsepower, the sidewheeler achieved a maximum speed of 14 km/h.

In the early 1930s, it was armed with two 37 mm naval guns and two 7.92 mm MG 08 heavy machine guns. After its conversion to an anti-aircraft role, it was equipped with two single 13.2 mm Hotchkiss M1929 heavy machine guns and two single 7.92 mm Maxim MG08s on anti-aircraft mounts.

The crew size varied, typically comprising 19 officers, non-commissioned officers, and sailors.

== Bibliography ==
- Bartlewicz, Jan (2013). Flotylla Pińska i jej udział w wojnie polsko-sowieckiej 1918-1920 [The Pinsk Flotilla and Its Role in the Polish-Soviet War 1918-1920] (in Polish). Oświęcim: Napoleon V. ISBN 978-83-7889-062-1.
- Borowiak, Mariusz (2014). Statki uzbrojone Flotylli Pińskiej [Armed Ships of the Pinsk Flotilla] (in Polish). Vol. 48. Warsaw: Edipresse Polska S.A. ISBN 978-83-7945-007-7.
- Borowiak, Mariusz (2006). Zapomniana Flota. Mokrany [The Forgotten Fleet: Mokrany] (in Polish). Gdańsk: Finna. ISBN 83-89929-80-5.
- Dyskant, Józef Wiesław (1994). Flotylla Rzeczna Marynarki Wojennej 1919-1939 [The River Flotilla of the Polish Navy 1919-1939] (in Polish). Warsaw: Bellona. ISBN 83-11-08251-0.
- Kułakowski, Mirosław (1988). Marynarka Wojenna Polski Odrodzonej: 1918-1939 [The Navy of Reborn Poland: 1918-1939] (in Polish). Vol. I. Toronto: Futura Graphics. ISBN 9780921866008.
