= ORP Warszawa (1920) =

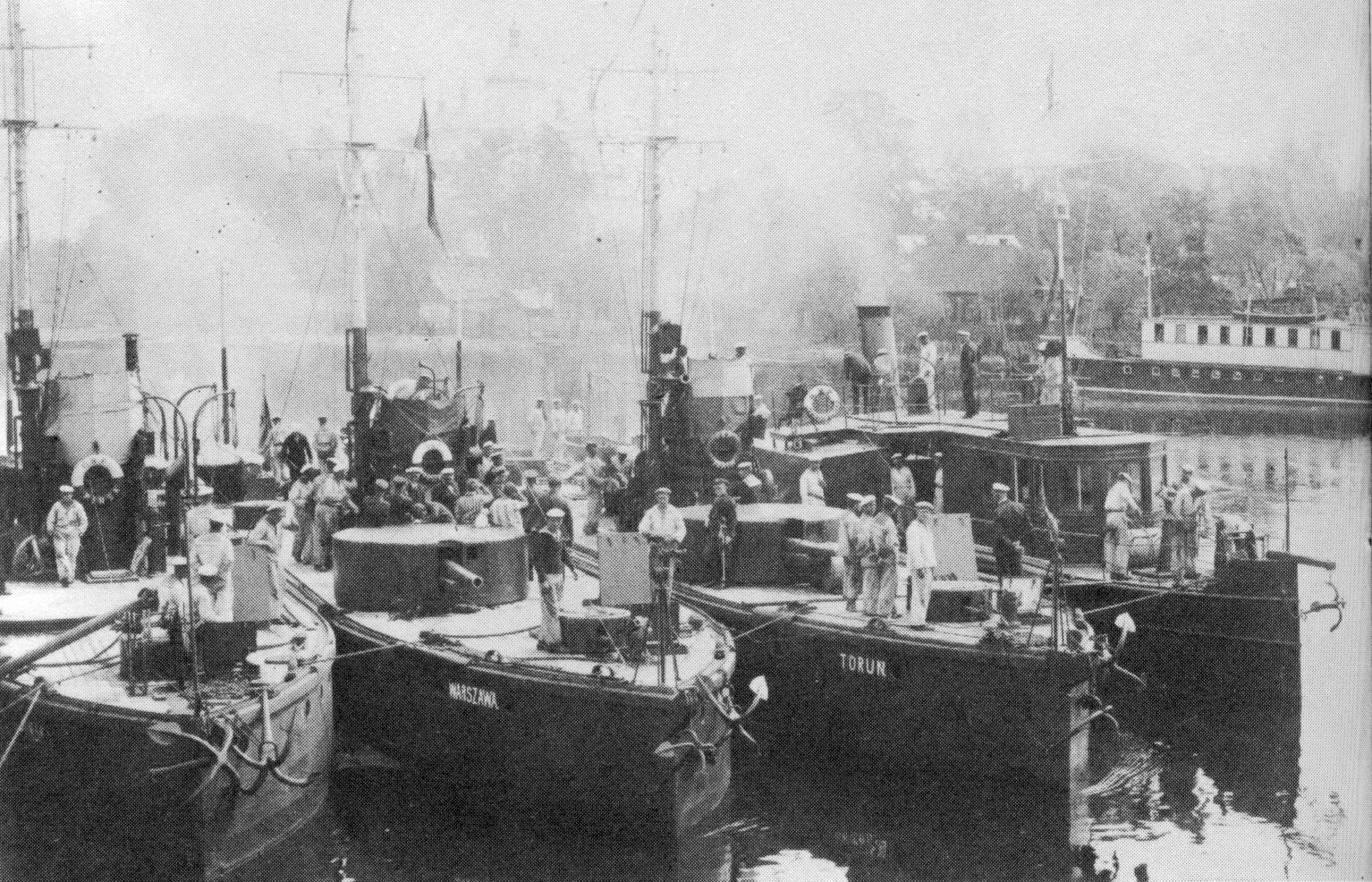
- River monitors Pińsk (left), Warszawa (centre) and Toruń (right), with the command vessel Generał Sikorski (extreme right)

History

Poland
- Name: ORP Warszawa
- Namesake: Warsaw
- Builder: Gdansk Shipyard
- Launched: 30 April 1920
- Commissioned: 13 August 1920
- Fate: Scuttled 18 September 1939

Soviet Union
- Name: Vitebsk (Витебск)
- Namesake: Vitebsk
- Acquired: Raised in October 1939
- Fate: Scuttled 18 September 1941; Raised in 1944 and scrapped

General characteristics
- Displacement: 110 - 112½ tons
- Length: 34.5 m (113.2 ft)
- Beam: 5.5 m (18.0 ft)
- Draught: 0.8 m (2.6 ft)
- Installed power: Until 1937: 180 hp (130 kW); After 1938: 200 hp (150 kW)
- Propulsion: Until 1937: 3 × Maybach 4-cylinder internal combustion engines; After 1938: 2 × Glennifer 6-cylinder internal combustion engines
- Speed: 8.6 kn (16 km/h)
- Complement: 44
- Armament: 1920 - 1930; 2 × 105 mm/47 guns; 1 x 100 mm/19 howitzer; 5 × 7.92 mm machine guns; 1930 - 1939; 2 × 75 mm howitzers; 5 × 7.92 mm machine guns; 1939 - 1941 (Soviet service); 3 × 76.2 mm guns; 4 × 7.62 mm machine guns
- Armour: Bulwarks - 5 mm (0.2 in); Deck - 6 mm (0.2 in); Bridge - 8 mm (0.3 in)

ORP Warszawa was an armed river monitor of the Riverine Flotilla of the Polish Navy, launched in 1920 and scuttled in 1939. She was raised by the Soviets, scuttled again in 1941, raised for the last time in 1944 and then scrapped.

== Construction ==
Warszawa was built in 1920 in the Free City of Danzig for the Polish Navy. Initially she was armed with two 105 mm guns and five machine guns, and by the late 1930s she carried three 75 mm guns and four machine guns.

== Invasion of Poland ==
Like all of the ships of the Riverine Flotilla of the Polish Navy in Pinsk, she was not used in combat during the German Invasion of Poland. After the Soviet invasion of Poland, she was scuttled on the Pripyat River on 18 September 1939, because of the impossibility of withdrawal.

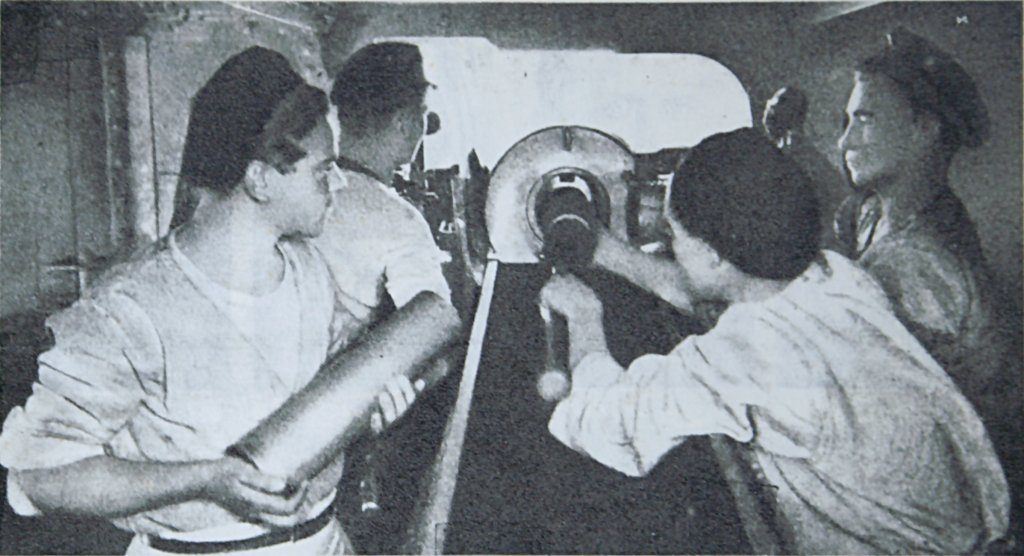
Inside the turret of a Polish river monitor

== Soviet service ==
She was raised on 11 October 1939 by the Soviets, towed to Factory No 300 in Kiev, repaired and commissioned as Vitebsk (Витебск). She served in the Dnepr Flotilla, then the Pinsk Flotilla. From July 1941 she fought against the Germans on the Berezina, Desna and Dnieper Rivers, in the defence of Kiev. Because of the Soviet retreat, she was scuttled on 18 September 1941 near Kiev.

== Fate ==
The wreck was raised in August 1944 by the Soviets, and then scrapped at Kiev.

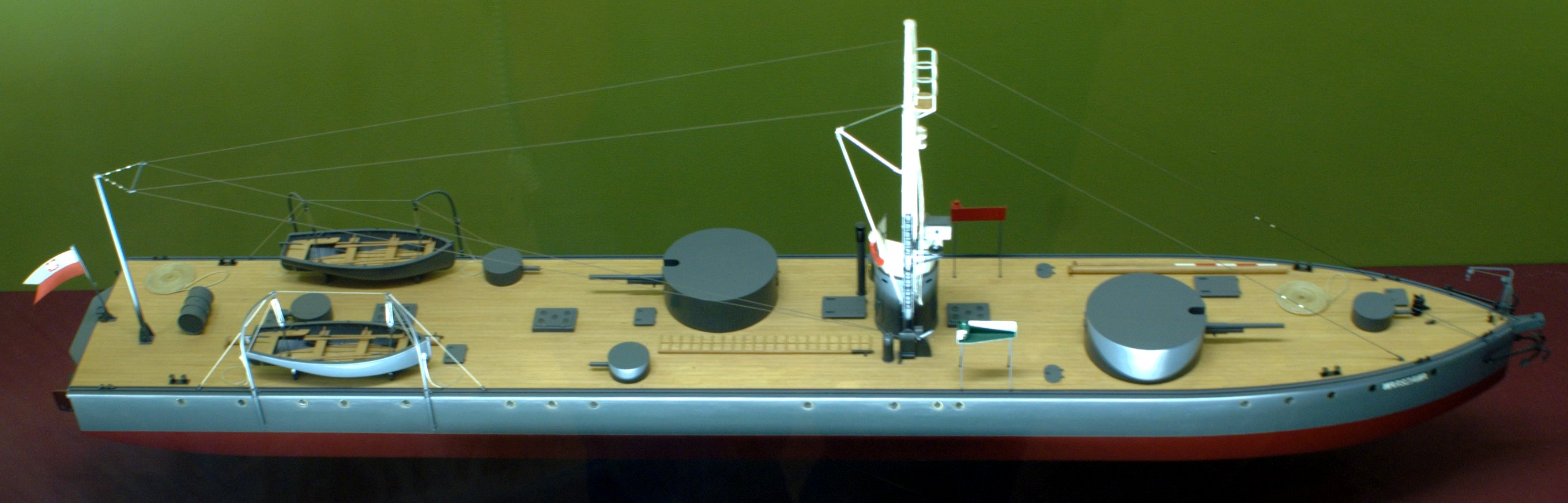
Model of Warszawa
