= Elber (disambiguation) =

Élber is a retired Brazilian football striker.

Elber may also refer to:

- Élber (footballer, born 1992), Brazilian football forward José Élber Pimentel da Silva
- Elber Binha, Cape Verdean football goalkeeper Jorge Mota Faial Delgado (born 1991)
- Elber Evora (born 1999), Cape Verdean football goalkeeper
- Joel Elber, American politician
- Elber (grapes), synonym for Elbling, a variety of white grapes

== See also ==
- Elbers, surname
- Elbe (disambiguation)
