= Elbe (disambiguation) =

Elbe is a river in the Czech Republic and Germany.

Elbe may also refer to:

== Places ==
- Elbe (Eder), a river in Hesse, Germany
- Elbe, Lower Saxony, Germany
- Elbe, Washington, United States

== People ==
- Jenny Elbe (born 1990), German athlete
- Lili Elbe (1882–1931), Danish artist and transgender woman
- Pascal Elbé (born 1967), French film actor and director

== Ships ==
- Elbe, a French frigate of 1805, better known as Aréthuse
- Elbe-class replenishment ship, German naval vessel class
  - German ship Elbe (A511), the lead ship
- Elbe (1887 ship), a British sailing vessel
- SS Elbe, several steamships

== Other uses ==
- Elbe, a variety of grape usually known as Elbling
- Elbe Air, a German airline
- Elbe Flugzeugwerke, an aerospace company in Dresden
- Elbe Project, the first commercial static high voltage direct current transmission system
- Sonderkommando Elbe, a German fighter task force in 1945
