= Elbers =

Elbers is a surname. Notable people with the surname include:

- Dirk Elbers (born 1959), German politician
- Ferdinand Elbers (1862–1943), Belgian mechanic, trade unionist and politician
- Jef Elbers (born 1947), Belgian singer
- Pieter Elbers (born 1970), Dutch airline executive
- Stanley Elbers (born 1992), Dutch footballer
