= ORP Gniezno =

Lublin-class minelayer landing ship

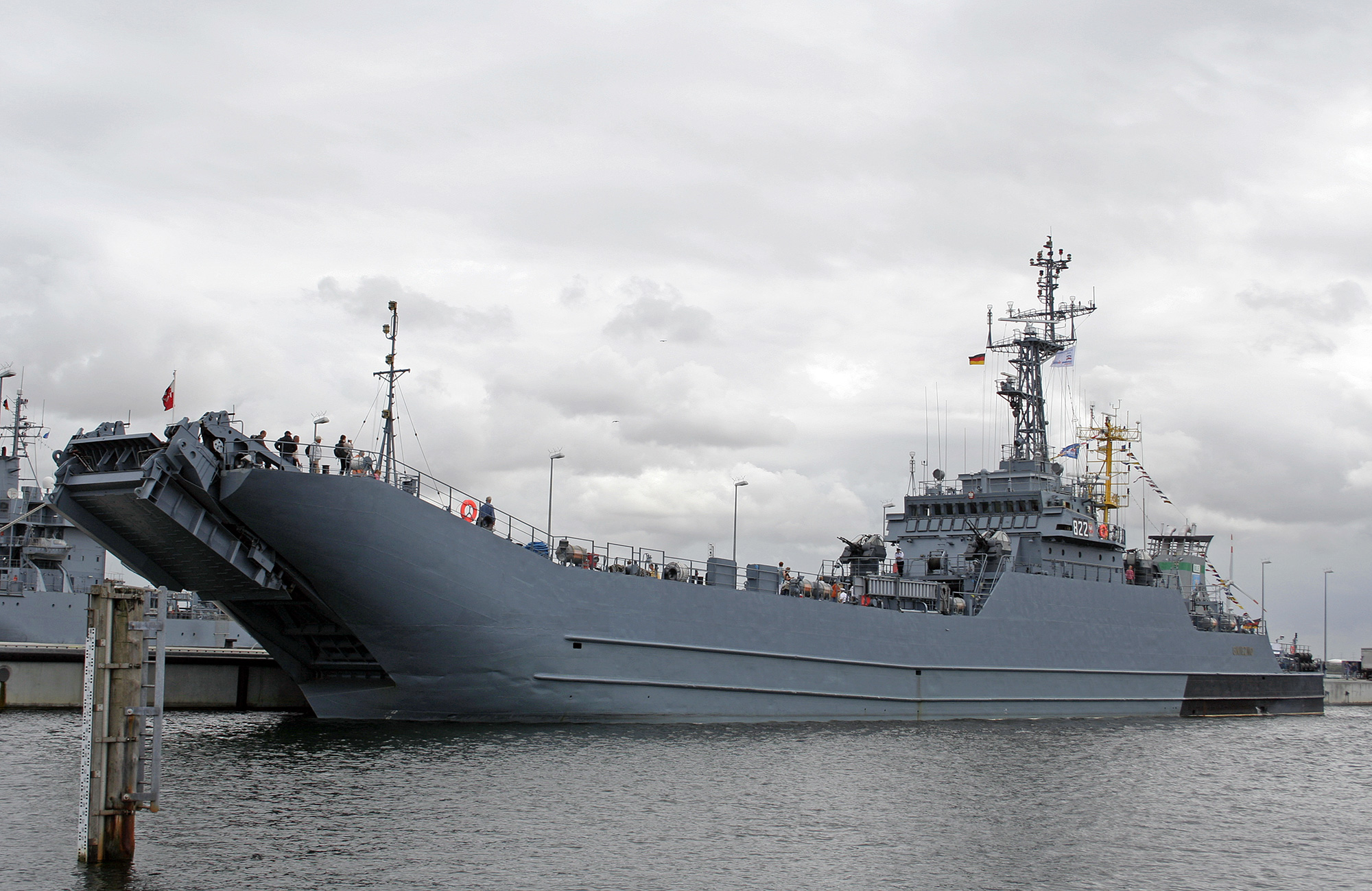
- ORP Gniezno on 9 August 2008.

History

Poland
- Name: Gniezno
- Namesake: Gniezno
- Builder: Northern Shipyard, Gdańsk
- Launched: 7 December 1988
- Commissioned: 23 February 1990
- Identification: MMSI number: 261234000; Callsign: SOWC; Pennant number: 822
- Status: Active

General characteristics
- Class & type: Lublin-class minelayer-landing ship
- Tonnage: 1675 tones
- Length: 95.8 m (314 ft 4 in)
- Beam: 10.8 m (35 ft 5 in)
- Depth: 2.38 m (7 ft 10 in)
- Installed power: 3x Cegielski-Sulzer 6ATL25D 1320 kW each
- Speed: 16.5 knots
- Capacity: 9 landing vessels up to 45 tones each
- Complement: 51-56 crew
- Armament: 2 × ZU-23-2MR units composed of two 23 mm guns and two Strela-2M surface-to-air missile system; 9 × ŁWD 100/5000 launching tubes

ORP Gniezno (822) is a Lublin-class minelayer-landing ship of Polish Navy, named after the city of Gniezno.

== Construction and career ==
The ship was commissioned on 23 February 1990 and incorporated into the 2nd Minelaying and Transport Unit of the 8th Coastal Defence Flotilla based in Świnoujście. Halina Ostrzycka became the captain of the ship. The ship took part in many national exercises, visited ports in Germany, Denmark and Norway.

The crew consists of 51 people, including 5 officers. The main tasks of the ship are to build defensive minefields and transport troops and landing techniques by sea. From October 2019, the commander of the ship is Cdr. Przemysław Lizik.

In 2017 and 2019, the ship took part in the BALTOPS, carrying out an landing on the beach in Ustka on 14 June 2017. In manoeuvres in 2019 the ship sustained damage to the hull plating in the bottom part of the ship, off the coast of Lithuania.

== Gallery ==
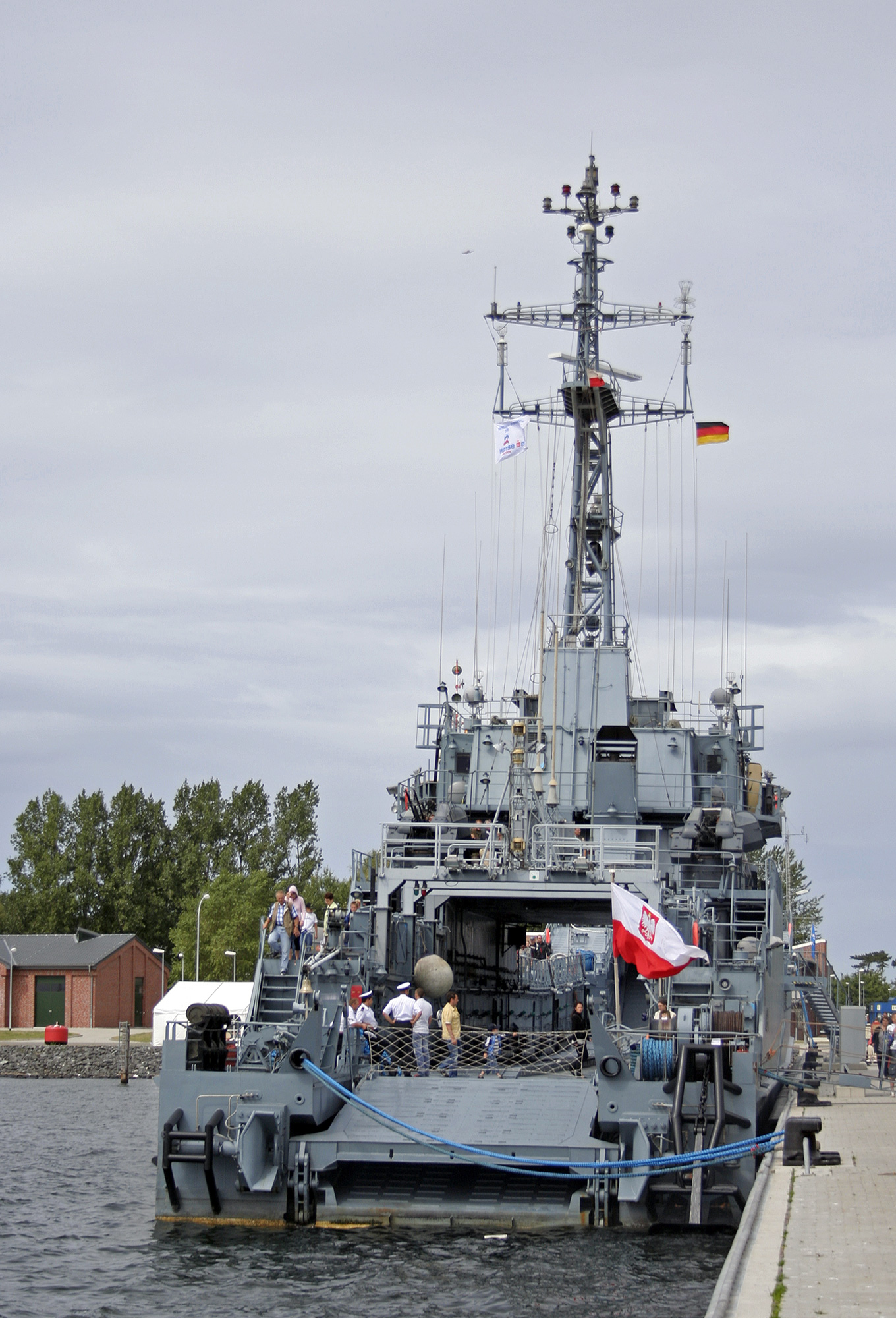
ORP Gniezno in Germany on 9 August 2008.

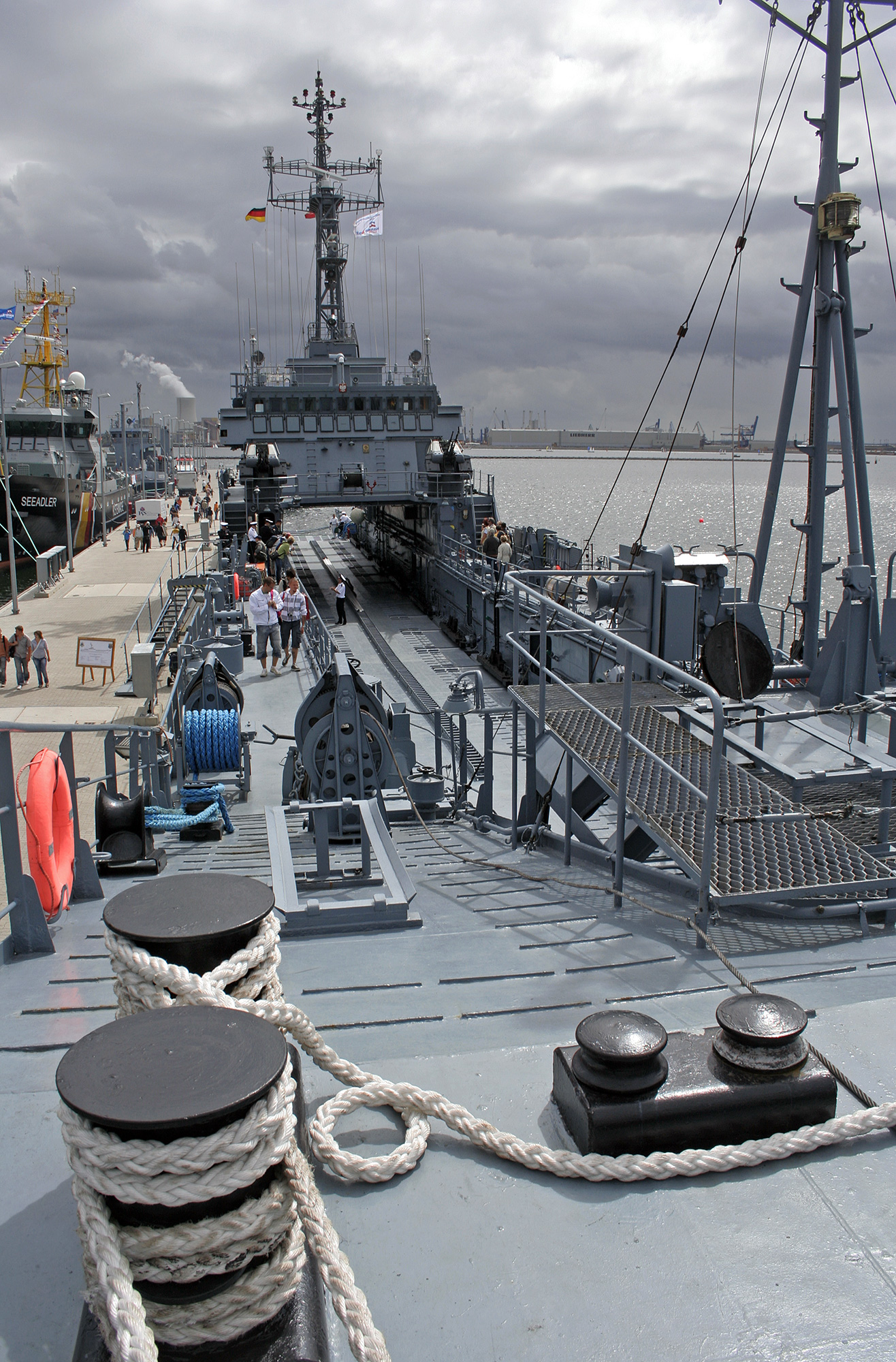
ORP Gniezno in Germany on 9 August 2008.

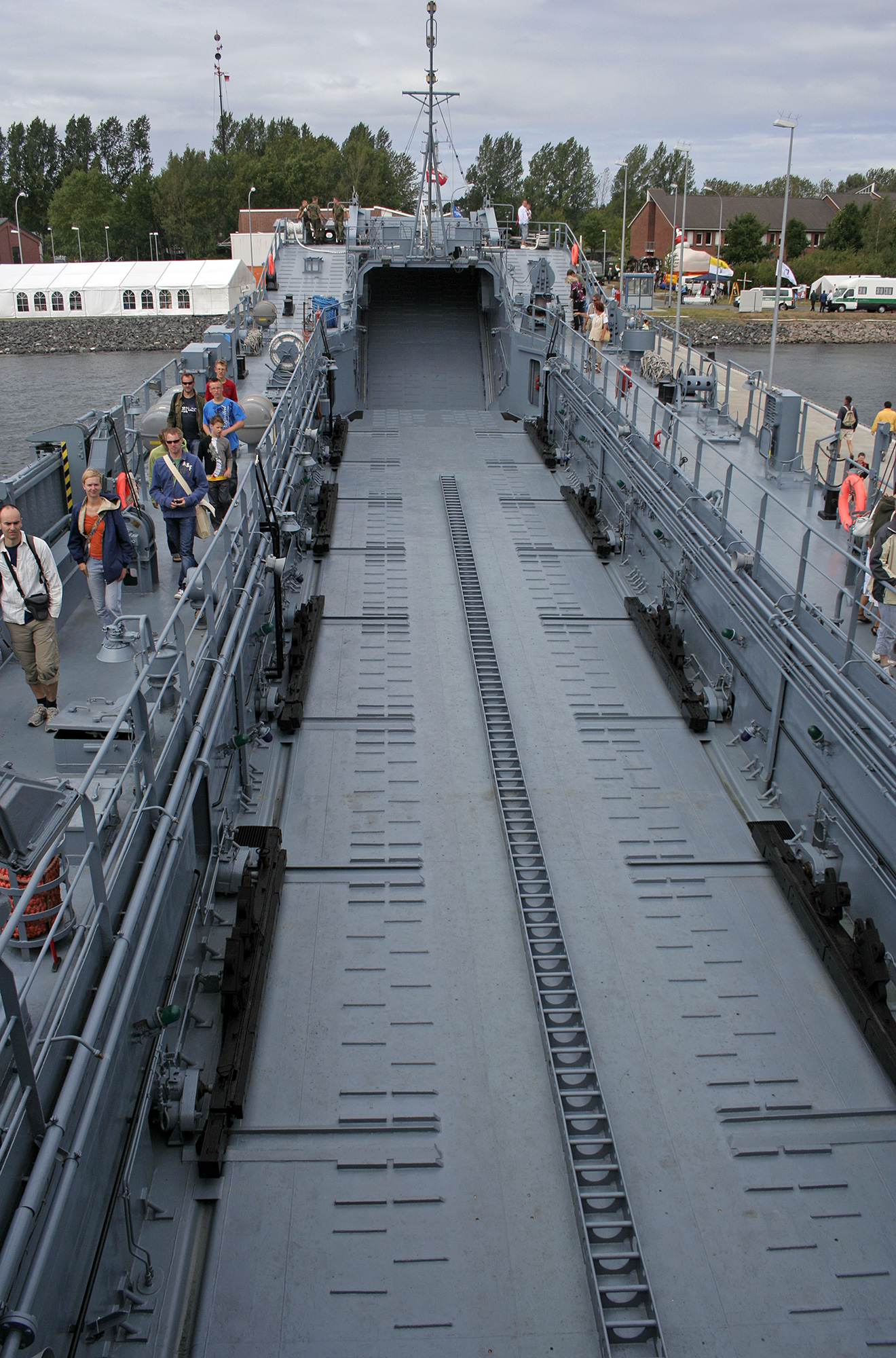
ORP Gniezno in Germany on 9 August 2008.

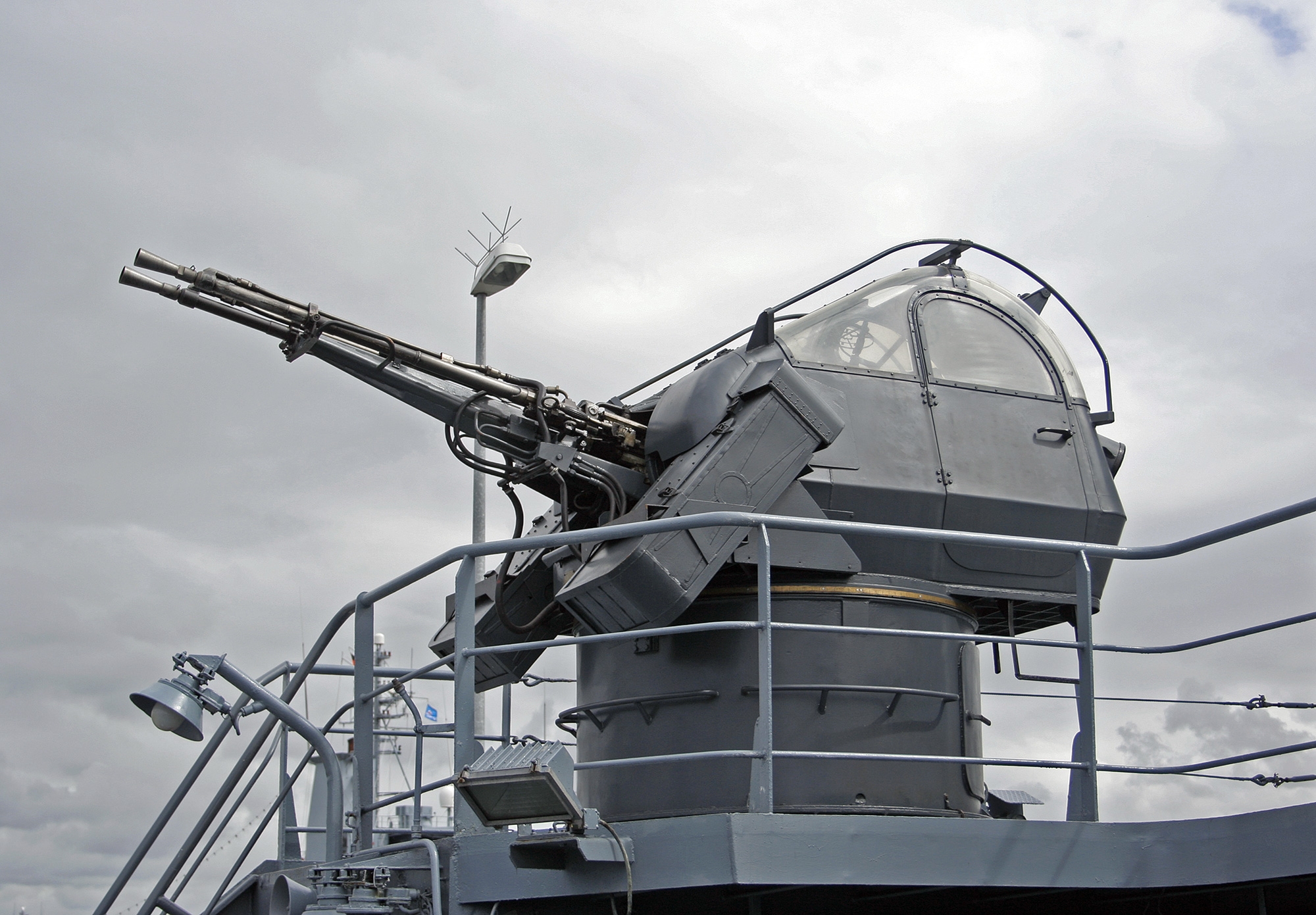
ORP Gniezno in Germany on 9 August 2008.

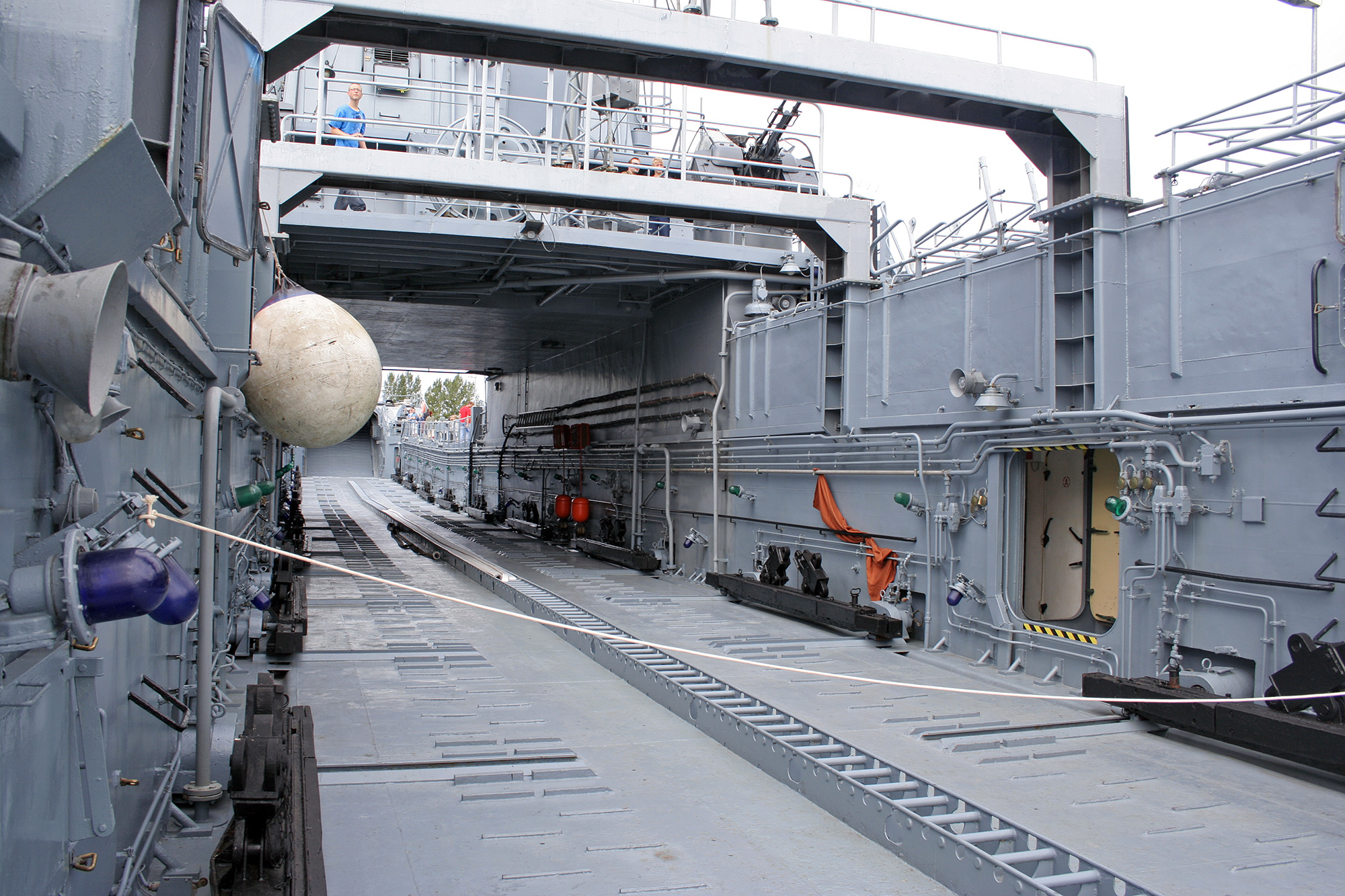
ORP Gniezno in Germany on 9 August 2008.

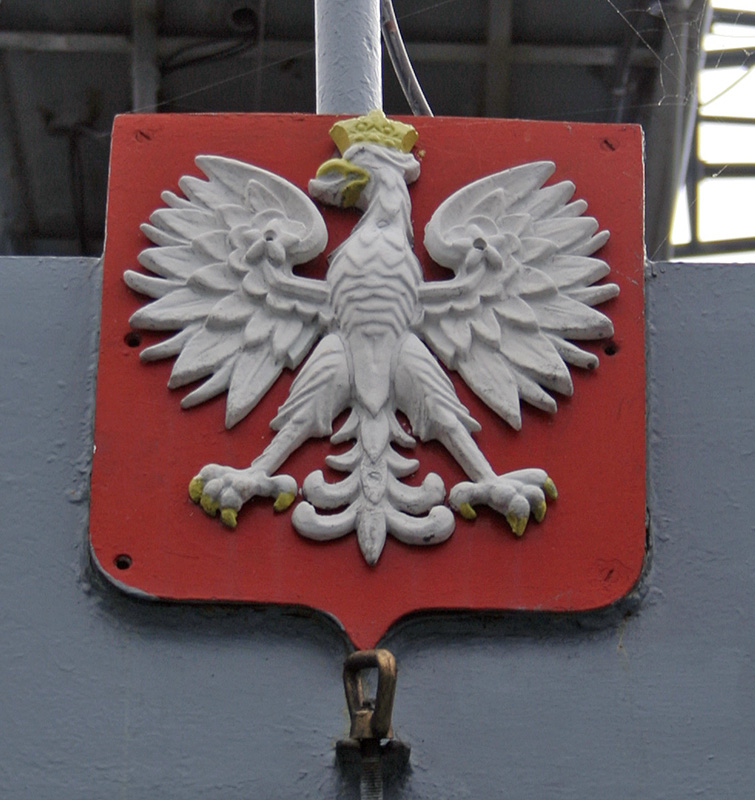
ORP Gniezno in Germany on 9 August 2008.

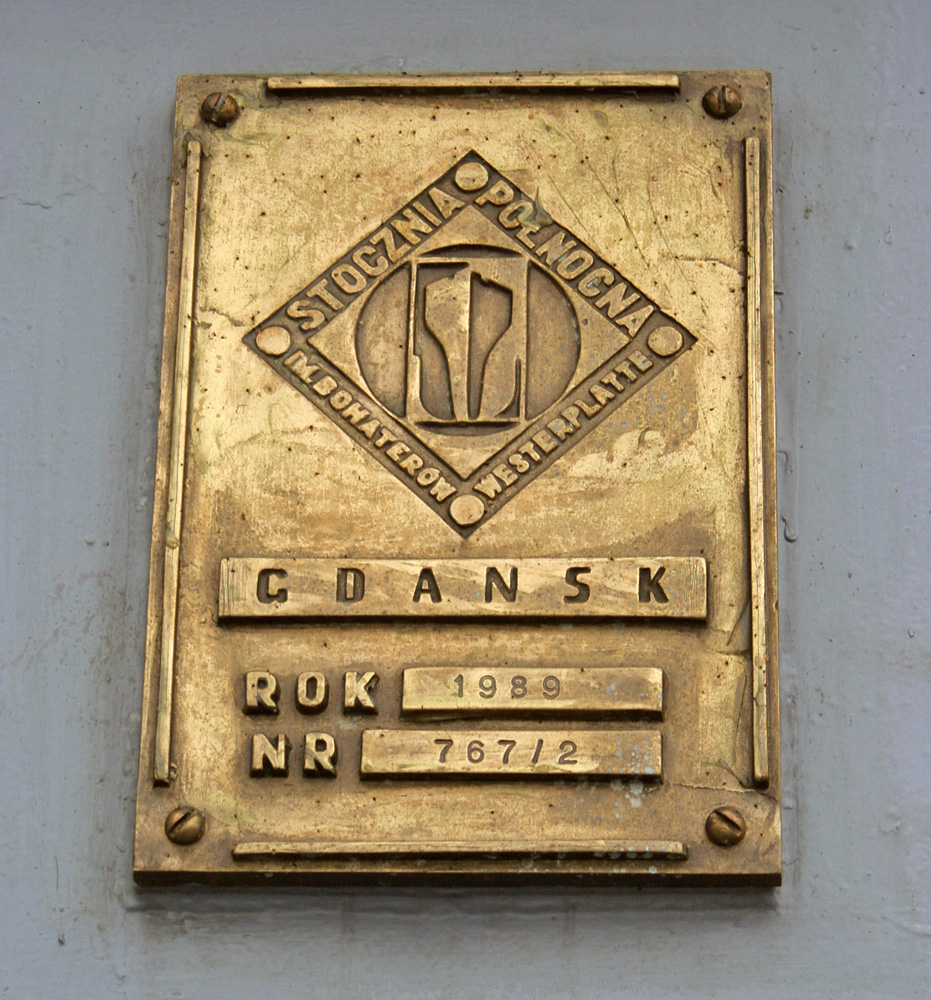
ORP Gniezno in Germany on 9 August 2008.

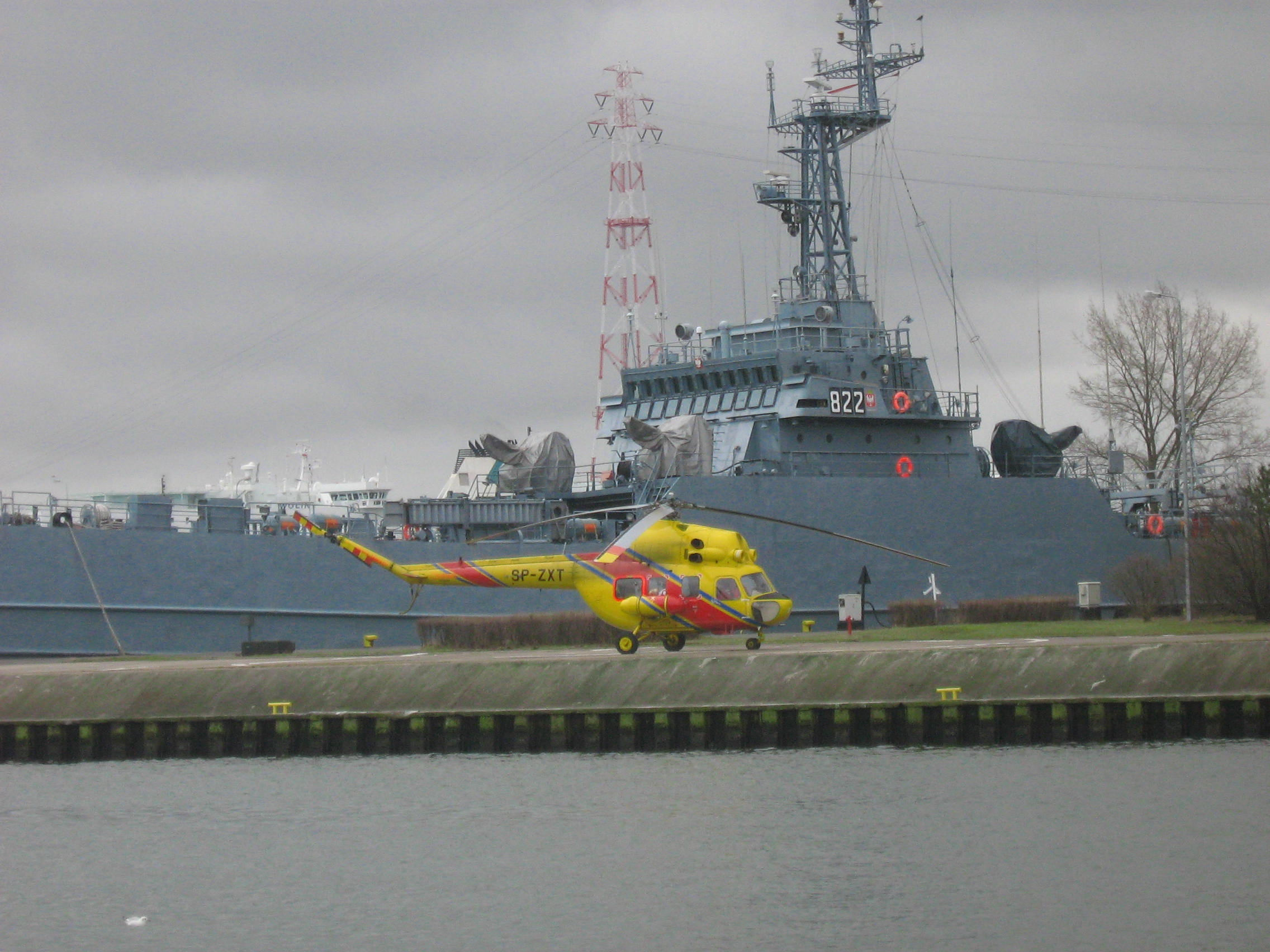
ORP Gniezno with a Mil Mi-2 in Świnoujście on 27 February 2009.

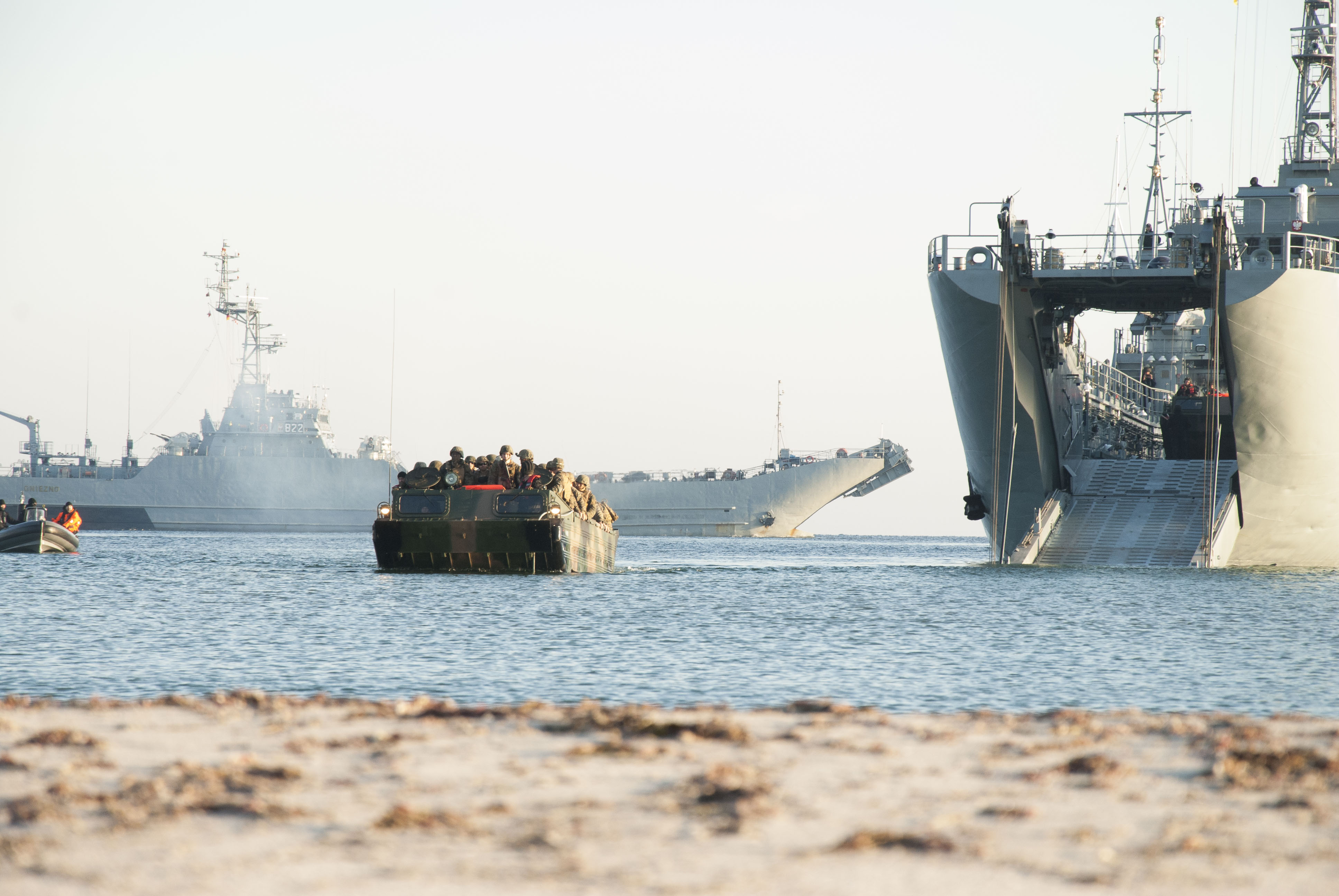
ORP Gniezno and ORP Kraków during BALTOPS 2017.
