= BALTOPS =

Annual military exercise

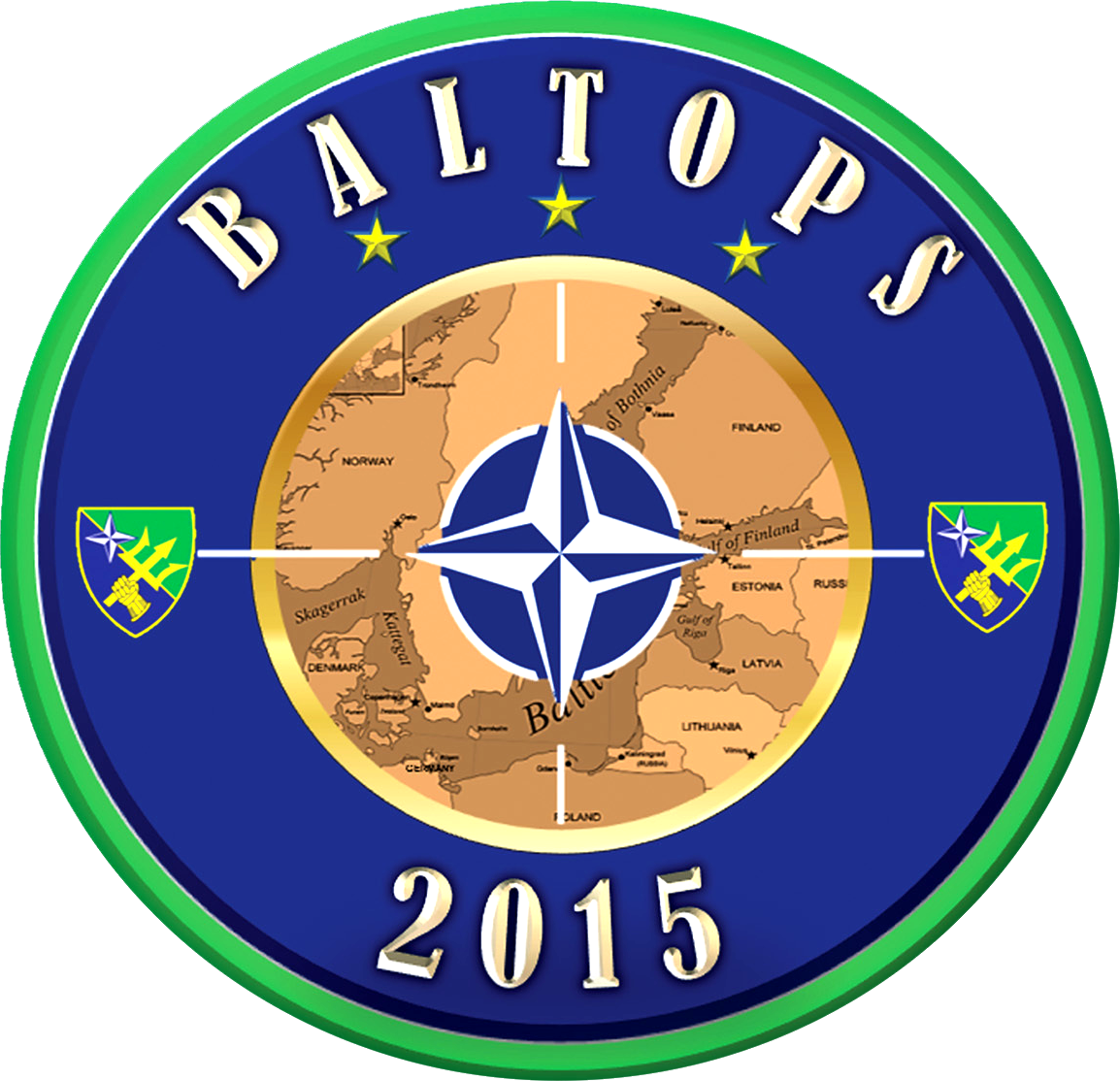
NATO BALTOPS 2015 logo

BALTOPS (Baltic Operations) is an annual military exercise, held and sponsored by the Commander, United States Naval Forces Europe, since 1971, in the Baltic Sea and the regions surrounding it.

The purpose of BALTOPS is to train gunnery, replenishment at sea, anti-submarine warfare (ASW), radar tracking & interception, mine countermeasures, seamanship, search and rescue, maritime interdiction operations and scenarios dealing with potential real world crises and maritime security.

== BALTOPS in the 1980s and 1990s ==
In 1985, Commander, Destroyer Squadron 14, was tasked with exercising freedom of navigation in the Baltic Sea and U.S. support for Northern European NATO countries. The mission of the first BALTOPS was to 'show-the-flag' to maintain the U.S. right to sail in international waters, even those in the Soviet Union's backyard. BALTOPS '85 added the objective of increasing the U.S. Navy's tactical proficiency in a strategically vital and challenging sea and air environment. To do this, Commander Destroyer Squadron 14 was assigned a Surface Action Group of six ships: USS Ticonderoga (CG-47), USS Iowa (BB-61), USS Aylwin (FF-1081), USS Halyburton (FFG-40), USS Pharris (FF-1094), and USS Merrimack (AO-179).

In late June 1990, Rear Admiral Thomas D. Paulson, Commander Cruiser-Destroyer Group Two, led USS Harry E. Yarnell (CG-17) and USS Kauffman (FFG-59) to visit Poland in conjunction with BALTOPS '90. Their port call at Gdynia represented the first visit by United States Navy vessels to Poland since 1927.

Since 1993 it has been a major contributor to the NATO programme Partnership for Peace, which aims to strengthen and create trust amongst former Soviet Union states (Estonia, Latvia, Lithuania) its former satellites (Bulgaria, Czech Republic, Hungary, Poland, Romania, Slovakia and Slovenia) and NATO. All these states have since joined NATO.

Common participants are (but not limited to): Canada, Denmark, Estonia, Finland, France, Germany, Latvia, Lithuania, Netherlands, Poland, Russia, Sweden, United Kingdom, United States of America (commanding country)

The 26th annual maritime exercise Baltic Operations (BALTOPS) '98 in the Western Baltic Sea took place from June 8–June 19, 1998. During the exercise, the commander, Carrier Group Eight, commanded the exercise from USS Vella Gulf.

== BALTOPS 2008 (36th) ==
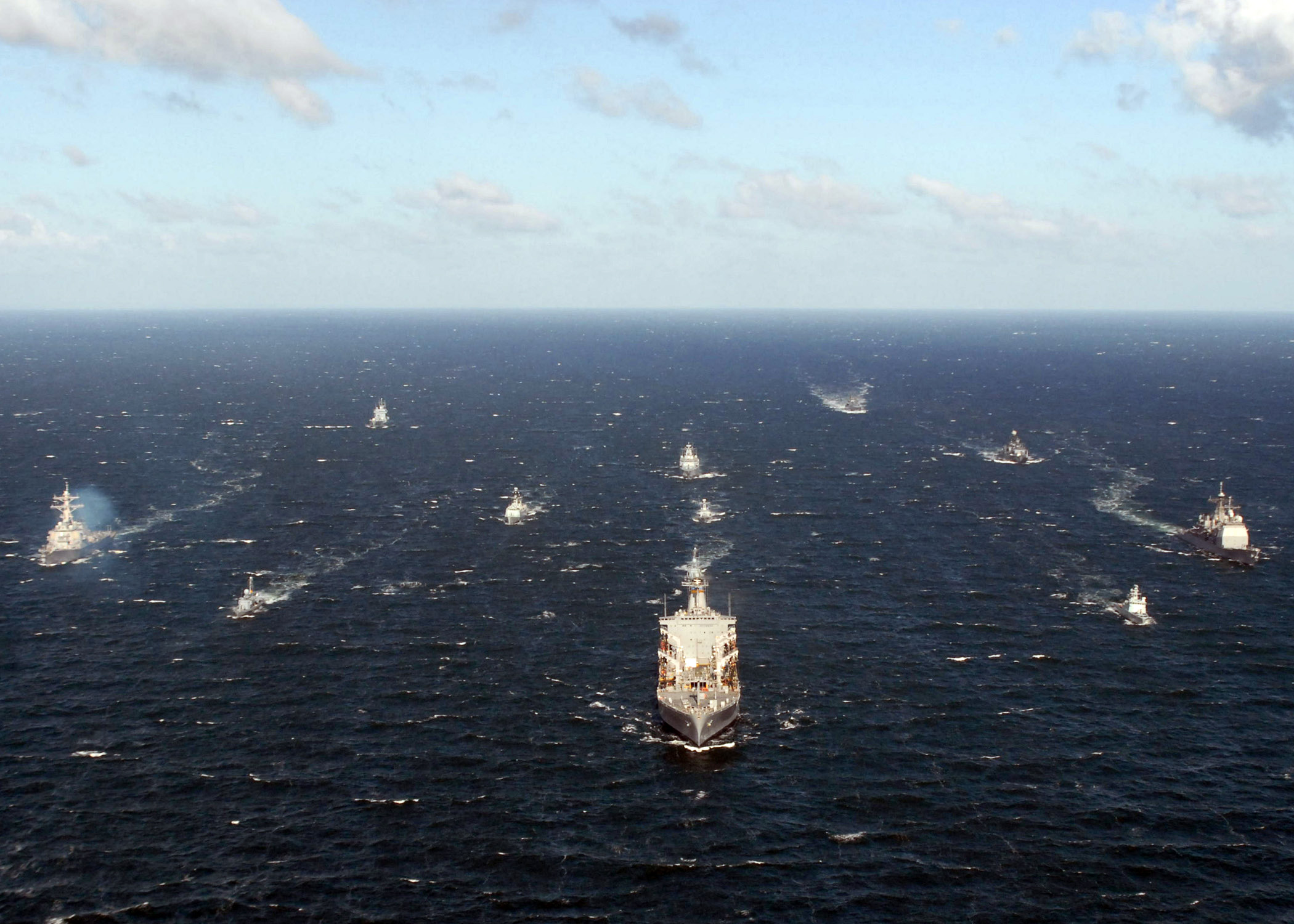
Ships from various navies participating in Baltic Operations 2008 maneuver into formation (11 June 2008)

BALTOPS 2008 took place between 8 June to 18 June 2008. Its objective was to promote mutual understanding, confidence, cooperation, and interoperability among the forces and personnel of the participating nations, as well as support national unit and staff training through a series of exercises. BALTOPS 2008 included surface warships, submarines, aircraft, and ground forces from Denmark, Estonia, Finland, France, Germany, Latvia, Lithuania, Norway, Poland, Russia, Sweden, the United Kingdom, and the United States.

Rear Admiral Daniel P. Holloway supervised BALTOPS 2008, and the guided-missile cruiser Gettysburg served as his flagship during this exercise. Gettysburg was accompanied by the guided-missile destroyer Cole and the fleet oiler Patuxent as part of the U.S. Navy's Task Group 369.4. Following BALTOPS 2008, the Cole paid a port visit to Stockholm, Sweden, on 27 June 2008, and Gettysburg paid a post-exercise port visit to Kiel, Germany. Gettysburg returned to Naval Station Mayport, Florida, on 14 July 2008, completing this two-month-long 2008 surge deployment for Carrier Strike Group Twelve.

== BALTOPS 2009 (37th) ==
On 16 June 2009, USNI bloggers took part in a DOD Bloggers Roundtable with Rear Admiral John Christenson, USN, Commander of Carrier Strike Group 12, the Enterprise carrier strike group. The topic of the call was BALTOPS 2009. According to DODLive, "BALTOPS 09 is a joint operation that allows personnel from partner nations to prepare for disaster relief efforts, humanitarian assistance, and peacekeeping efforts." Moreover, according to DODLive, "this is the 37th anniversary of Exercise BALTOPS and includes Denmark, Estonia, Finland, France, Germany, Latvia, Lithuania, Netherlands, Poland, Sweden, the United Kingdom, and the United States."

BALTOPS 2009 vessels

BALTOPS 2009 participating vessels:

- HDMS Glenten (P557)
- HDMS Makrelen (P554)
- HDMS Esbern Snare (L17)
- HDMS Thetis (F357)
- HDMS Peter Tordenskiold (F356)
- HMS St Albans (F83)
- FGS Elbe (A511)
- FGS Karlsruhe (F212)
- FGS Hameln (M1092)
- FGS Puma (P6122)
- FGS Nerz (P6124)
- FGS Zobel (P6125)
- USS Forrest Sherman (DDG-98)
- USS Mount Whitney (LCC-20)

== BALTOPS 2011 (39th) ==
BALTOPS 2011 occurs from 3–17 June 2011 among NATO and Partnership for Peace participants. Led by the United States, BALTOPS is a USEUCOM directed, COMUSNAVEUR sponsored, and United States Sixth Fleet executed exercise. The primary planning and execution commander is Commander Carrier Strike Group Eight. The mission of BALTOPS 2011 was interoperability among forces and personnel of participating national unit and staff training objectives through a series of robust training exercises.

BALTOPS 2011 participating countries include Belgium, Denmark, Estonia, France, Georgia, Germany, Latvia, Lithuania, The Netherlands, Poland, Russia, Sweden, and the United States.

BALTOPS 2011 vessels

BALTOPS 2011 participating vessels:

- EML Ugandi (M315)
- HDMS Absalon (L16)
- HDMS Havkatten (P 522)
- HNLMS De Ruyter (F804)
- HSwMS Gävle (K22)
- HSwMS Sundsvall (K24)
- Leopold I (F930)
- RFS Minsk (127)
- ORP Generał Tadeusz Kościuszko (273)
- FGS Schleswig-Holstein (F216)
- LKL Sūduvis (M52)
- USS Philippine Sea (CG-58)

== BALTOPS 2015 (43rd) ==
17 countries took part in BALTOPS which started on 5 June and lasted till 20 June. Allied participation demonstrates NATO's resolve to defend the Baltic region, and will hone the ability of Allies and partners to work together.

Participants include Belgium, Canada, Denmark, Estonia, Finland, France, Germany, Georgia, Latvia, Lithuania, the Netherlands, Norway, Poland, Sweden, Turkey, the United Kingdom, and the United States.

BALTOPS 2015 vessels

BALTOPS 2015 participating vessels:

- EML Sakala (M314)
- EML Tasuja (A432)
- HDMS Peter Willemoes (F362)
- HDMS Niels Juel (F363)
- HDMS Absalon (L16)
- HDMS Hirsholm (MSD-5)
- HDMS MSF-1
- HMS Iron Duke (F234)
- HMS Quorn (M41)
- HMS Ocean (L12)
- HMCS Fredericton (FFH 337)
- HSwMS Malmö (P12)
- HNoMS Otra (M351)
- HNoMS Rauma (M352)
- FNS Hämeenmaa (02)
- LVNS Virsaitis (A53)
- HNLMS Makkum (M857)
- HNLMS Urk (M861)
- HNLMS Zierikzee (M862)
- HNLMS Willemstad (M864)
- HNLMS Luymes (A803)
- ORP Bukowo (632)
- ORP Mewa (633)
- ORP Resko (637)
- ORP Mamry (643)
- ORP Wigry (644)
- ORP Lublin (821)
- ORP Gneizno (822)
- ORP Kondor (297)
- TCG Göksu (F497)
- HSwMS Sundsvall (K24)
- FS Eridan (M641)
- FS Somme (A631)
- MV Blue Capella
- LNS Skalvis (M53)
- LNS Kuršis (M54)
- LNS Žemaitis (P11)
- FGS Lübeck (F214)
- FGS Braunschweig (F260)
- FGS Hemerlin (P6123)
- FGS Wiesel (P6129)
- FGS Hyâne (P6130)
- FGS Auerbach (M1093)
- FGS Fehmarn (A1458)
- FGS Donau (A516)
- USS Vicksburg (CG-69)
- USS Jason Dunham (DDG-109)
- USS San Antonio (LPD-17)

== BALTOPS 2020 (49th) ==
BALTOPS 2020 took place from 7–16 June 2020 among NATO and Partnership for Peace participants. The exercises were concluded by the United States Sixth Fleet.

BALTOPS 2020 participating countries include Canada, Denmark, Estonia, Finland, France, Germany, Greece, Italy, Latvia, Lithuania, the Netherlands, Norway, Poland, Portugal, Spain, Sweden, Turkey, the United Kingdom and the United States.

BALTOPS 2020 vessels

BALTOPS 2020 participating vessels:

- EML Sakala (M314)
- EML Wambola (A433)
- FNS Purunpää (41)
- FGS Werra (A514)
- FGS Donau (A516)
- FGS Lübeck (F214)
- FGS Rhön (A1443)
- LVNS Tālivaldis (M-06)
- ORP Druzno (641)
- LNS Aukštaitis (P-14)
- LNS Skalvis (M53)
- HMS Ramsey (M110)
- HNoMS Otto Sverdrup (F312)
- HMCS Fredericton (FFH 337)
- HNMLS Urk (M861)
- HNLMS Zierikzee (M862)
- USNS Supply (T-AOE-6)
- USS Donald Cook (DDG-75)
- USS Mount Whitney (LCC-20)

== BALTOPS 2022 (51st) ==
A total of 14 NATO nations, including NATO partner nations Finland and Sweden, took part in the 51st BALTOPS exercise between 5 and 17 June 2022. The usual mine hunting exercise was augmented this year with U.S. experimental mine hunting unmanned underwater vehicles and the collection of environmental data for target recognition algorithms, in conjunction with the Naval Undersea Warfare Center and Naval Information Warfare Center Pacific.

BALTOPS 2022 was shadowed by two Russian Karakurt-class corvettes.

Investigative journalist Seymour Hersh alleged in his newsletter that during the exercises, the U.S. Navy planted explosive charges on the Nord Stream pipelines, resulting in their explosion later that year. The U.S. government denied this claim, calling it "utterly false and complete fiction." As of February 2023, according to The Washington Post, no other media outlet has corroborated Hersh's allegations. In October 2024, the Swiss newspaper Die Weltwoche wrote an article implicating the USS Kearsarge and other US Navy ships from BALTOPS 22 in the Nord Stream sabotage without referring to Hersh's allegations.

BALTOPS 2022 vessels

BALTOPS 2022 participating vessels:

- HMS Defender (D36)
- HMS Archer (P264)
- HMS Charger (P292)
- HMS Explorers (P164)
- HMS Exploit (P167)
- HMS Ranger (P293)
- HMS Smiter (P272)
- USS Kearsarge (LHD-3)
- FNS Uusimaa
- HSwMS Nyköping (K34)
- USS Mount Whitney (LCC-20)
- USS Porter (DDG-78)
- ORP Toruń
- German frigate Sachsen

== BALTOPS 2023 (52nd) ==
BALTOPS 2023 took place from 4 to 16 June 2023. More than 6,000 personnel, 50 ships, and 45 aircraft participated. Personnel alone were more than double participation of 2020. Navies of 20 countries participated in and near the Baltic Sea. Certain nations also participated in the unconnected but similarly timed Arctic Challenge.

BALTOPS 2023 vessels
BALTOPS 2023 participating vessels:

== BALTOPS 2024 (53rd) ==
BALTOPS 2024 took place from 4 to 20 June 2024. It was the largest BALTOPS exercise ever held and the first one to have all participants being NATO members (after Sweden joined NATO).

== Gallery ==
BALTOPS

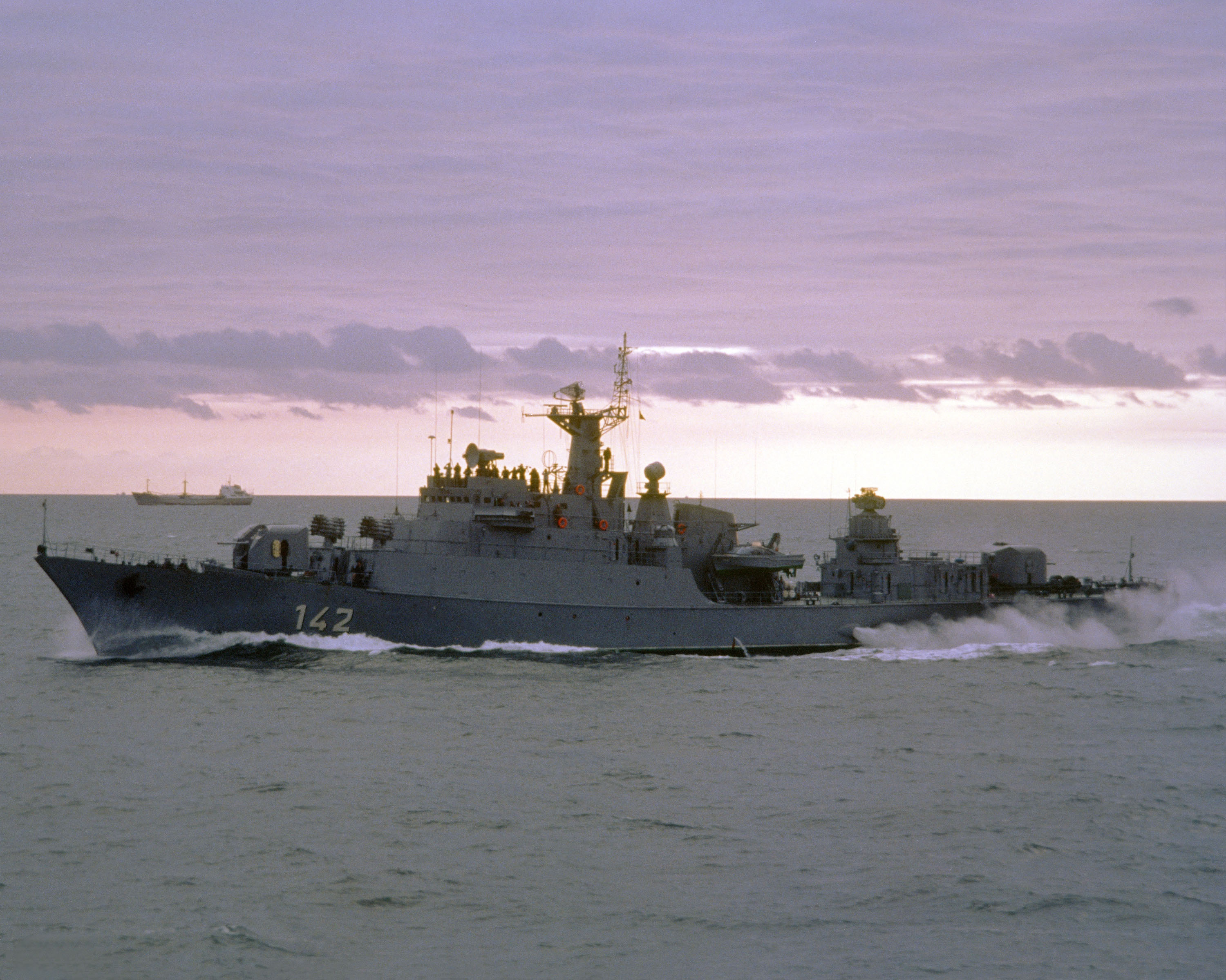
East Germany Koni class frigate Berlin underway during NATO Exercise BALTOPS '85, on 1 October 1985

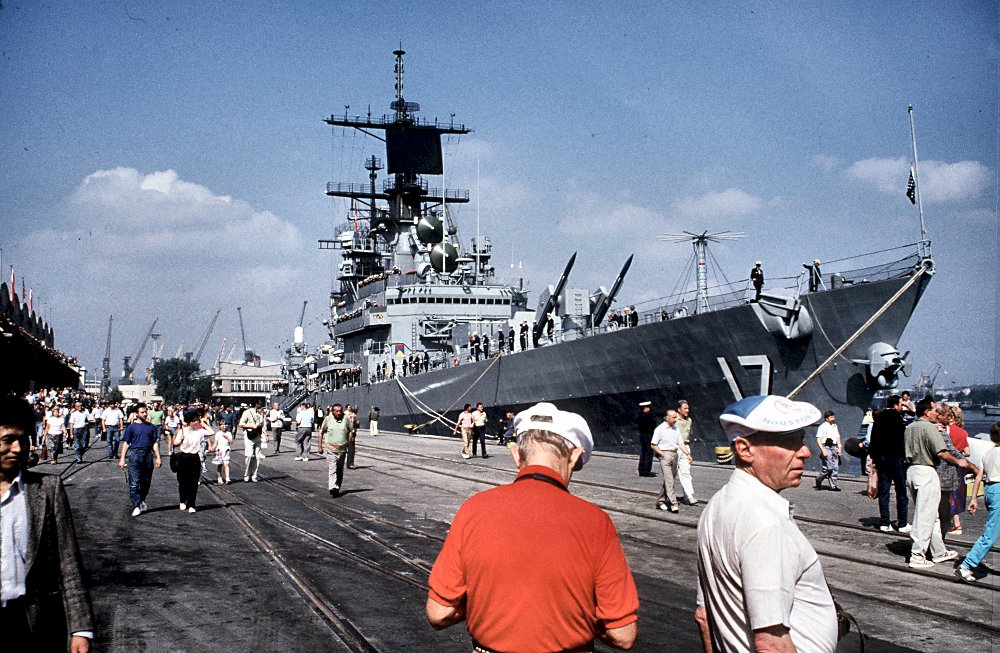
USS Harry E. Yarnell at Gdynia during BALTOPS '90

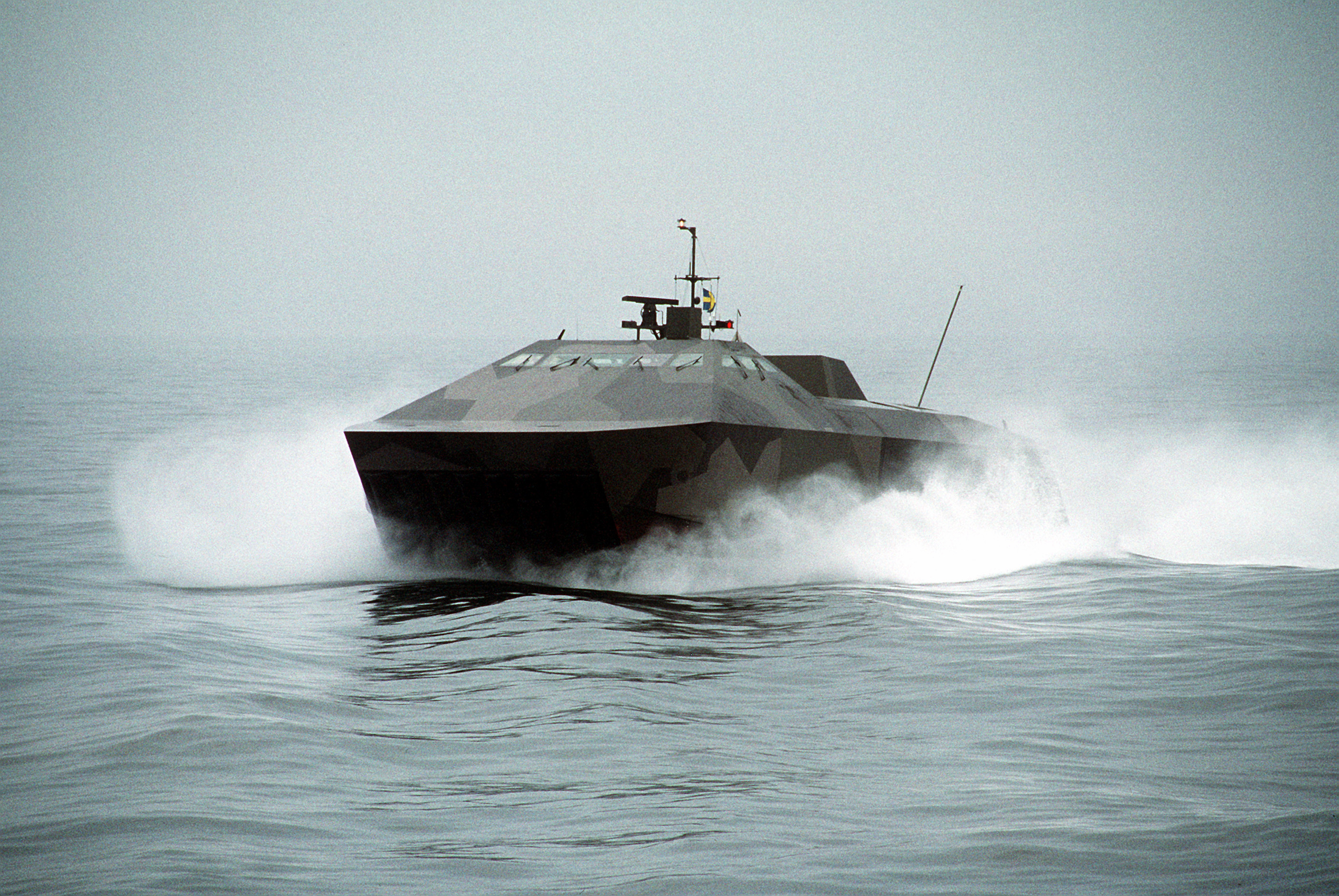
HSwMS Smyge underway during BALTOPS '94, on 7 June 1994

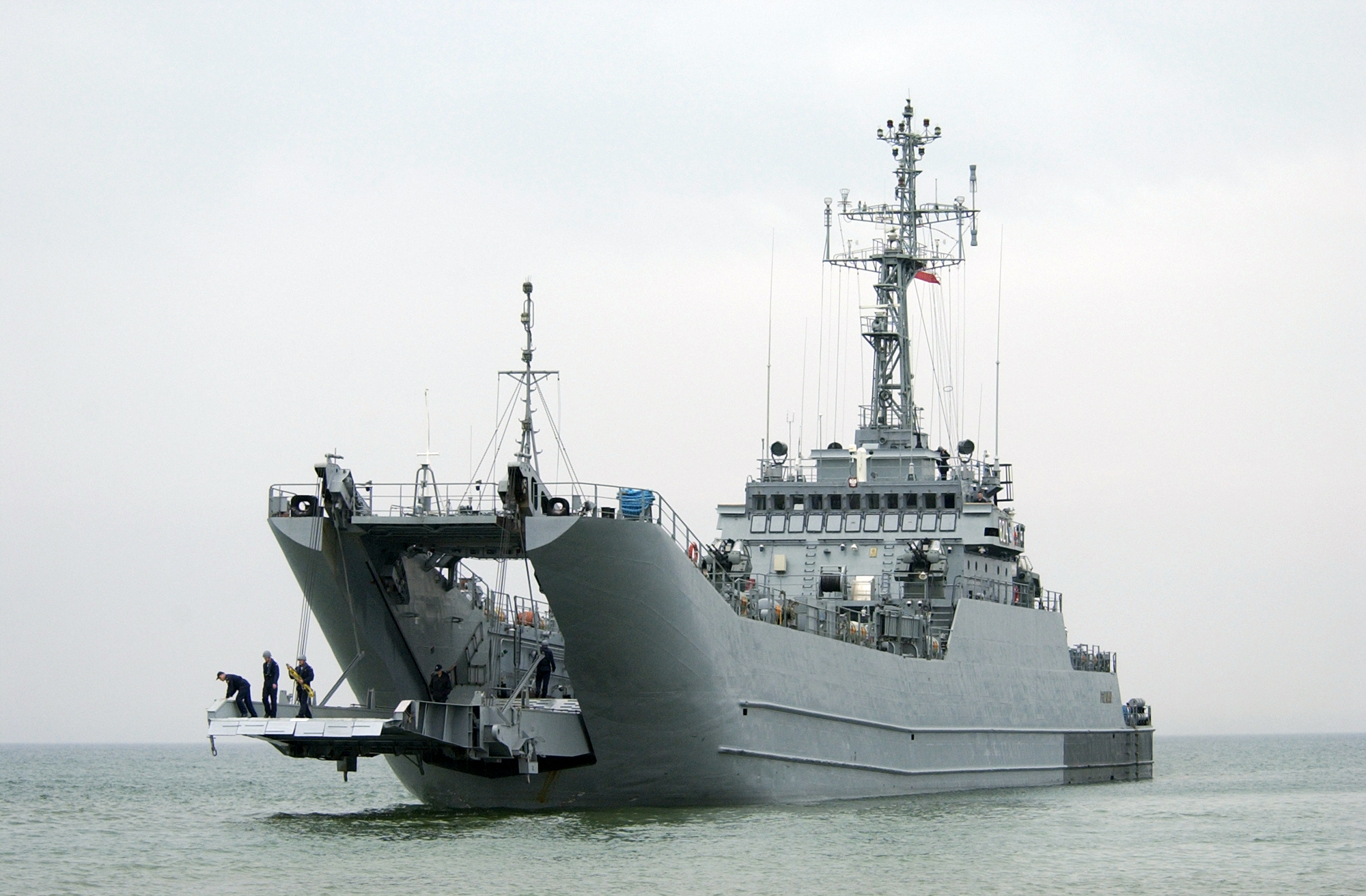
ORP Poznań during BALTOPS '04

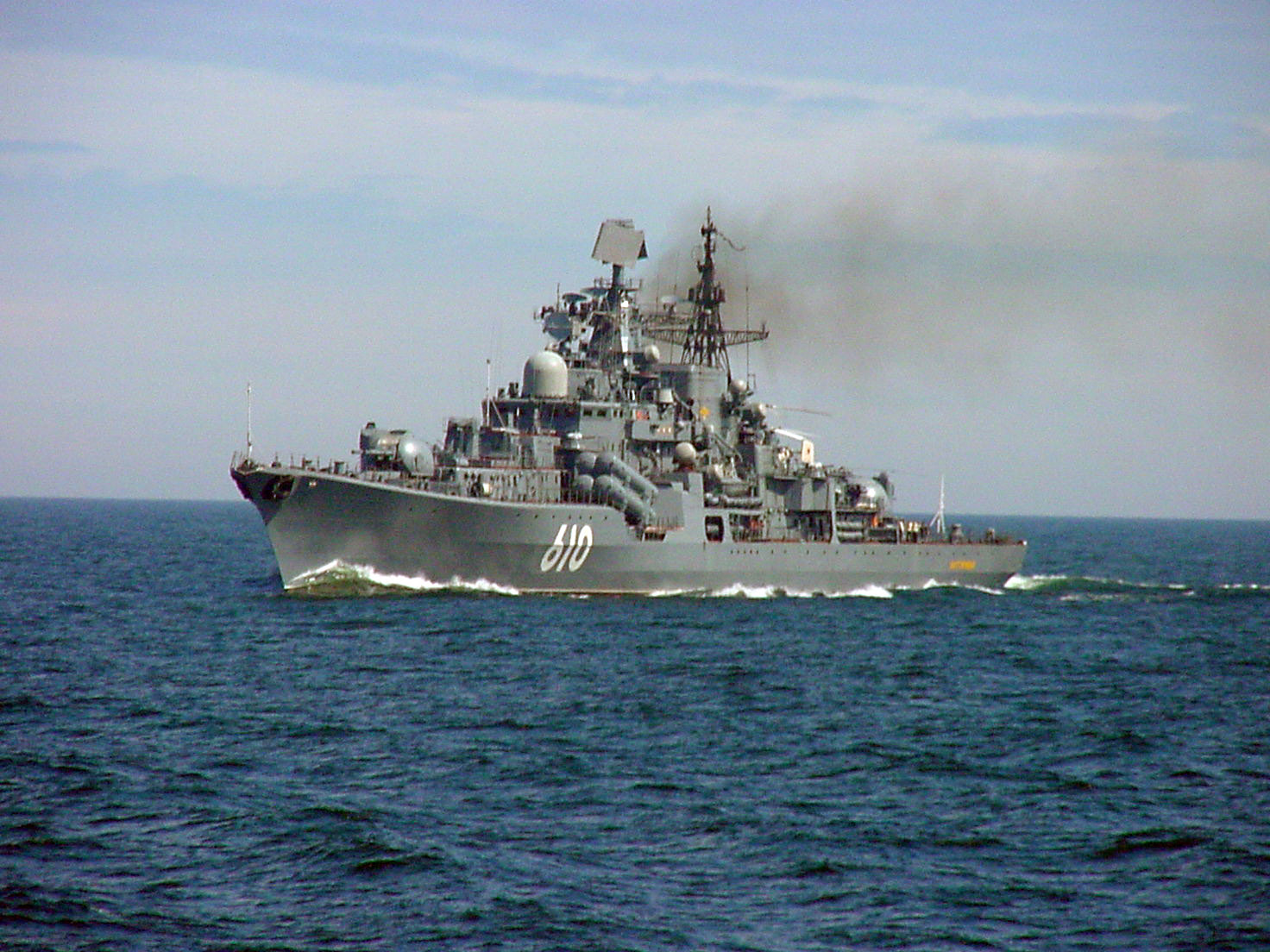
Russian Navy Nastoychivyy underway during BALTOPS '05

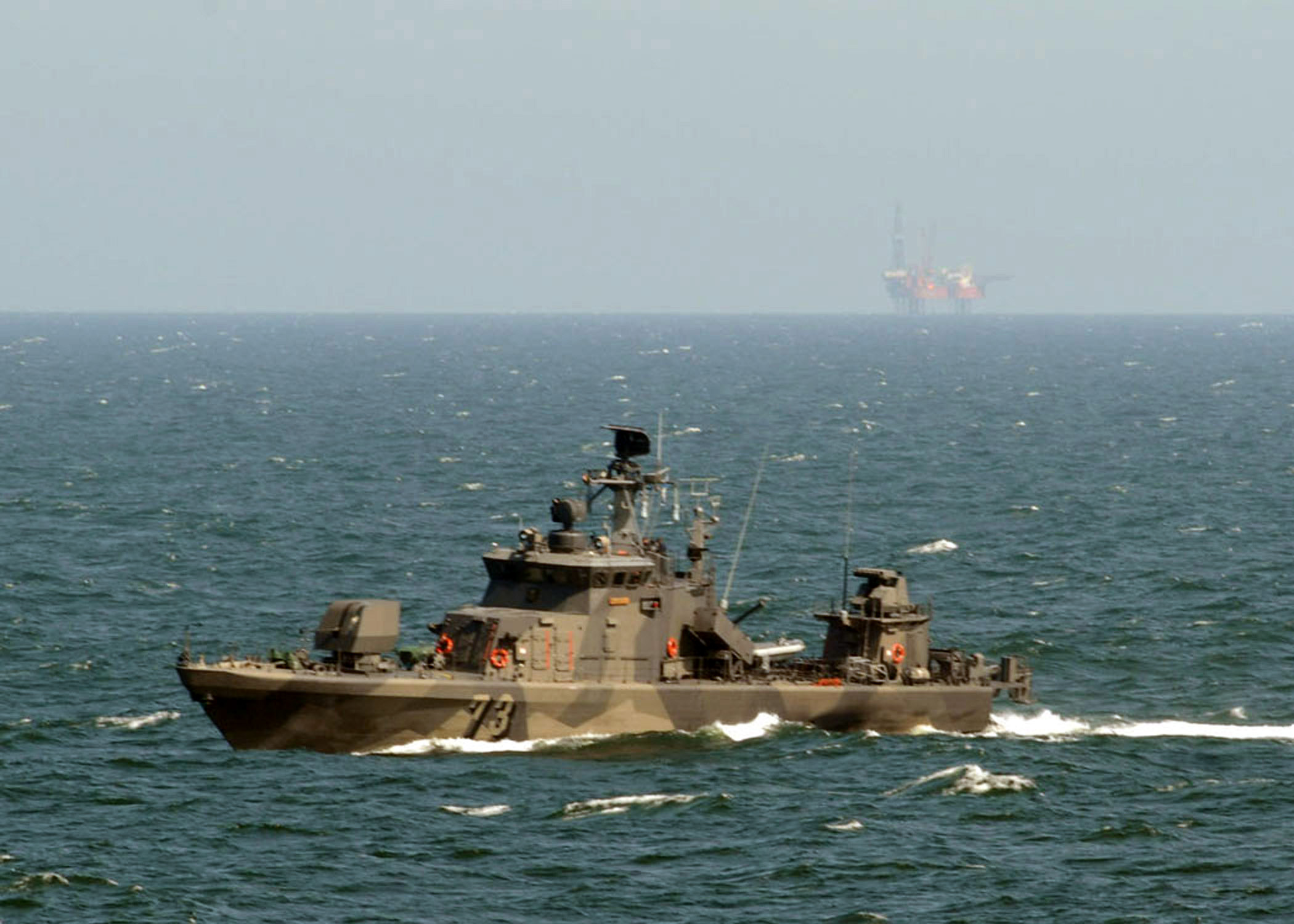
Finnish Navy Naantali underway during BALTOPS '08

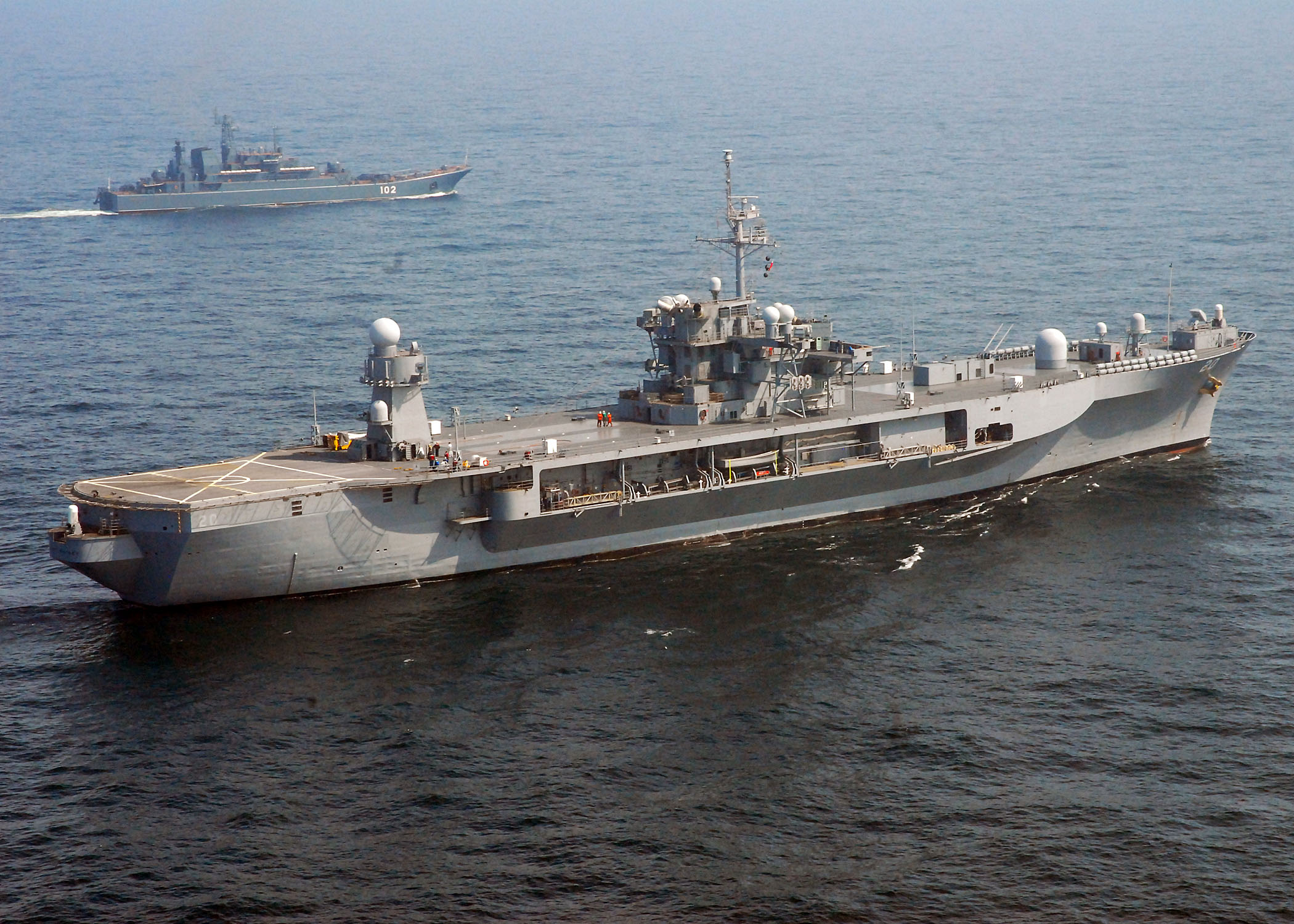
USS Mount Whitney during BALTOPS '10

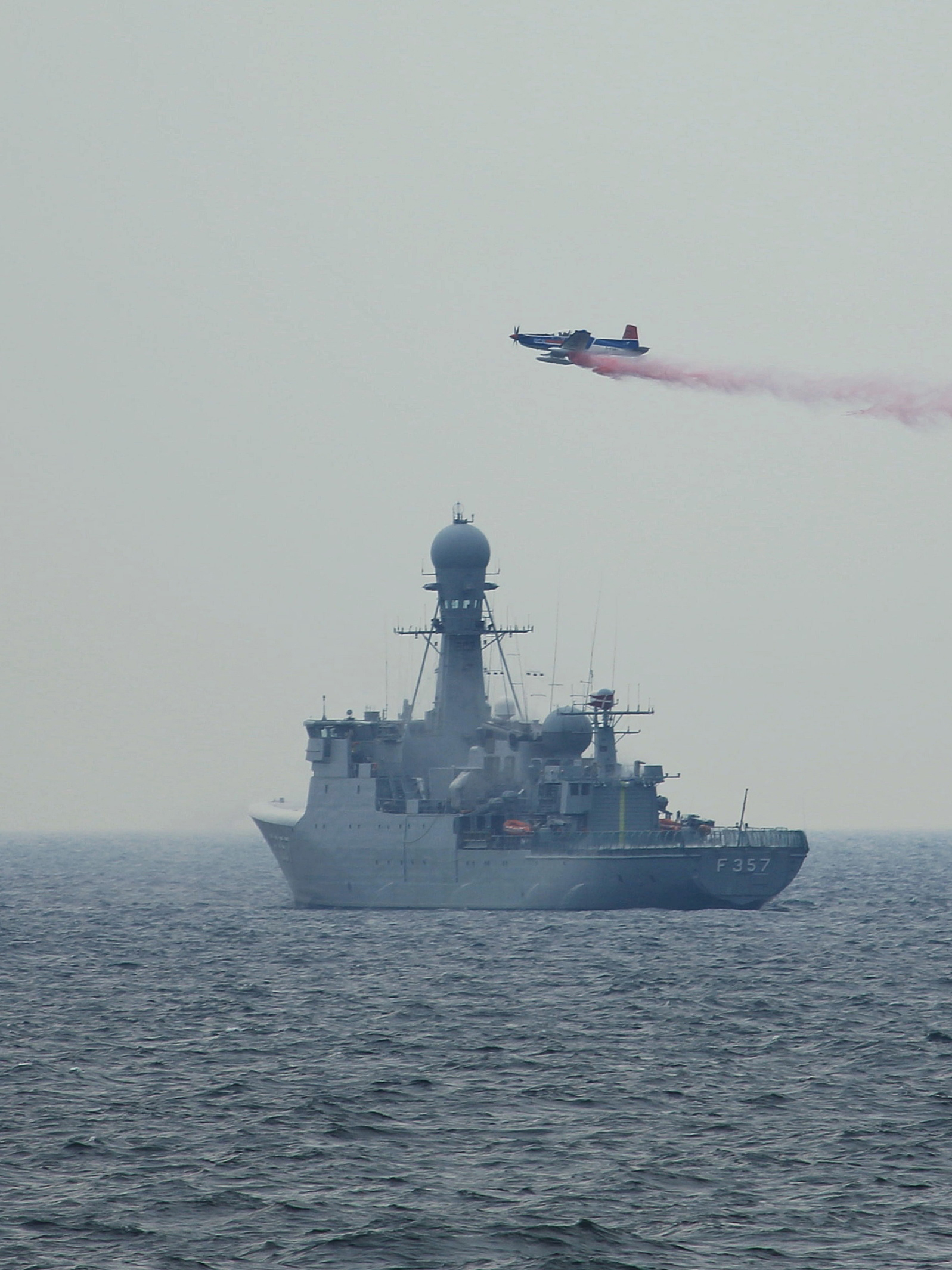
A Pilatus PC-9 simulates an airborne chemical attack against the Royal Danish Navy HDMS Thetis (F357) during BALTOPS '13, on 13 June 2013.

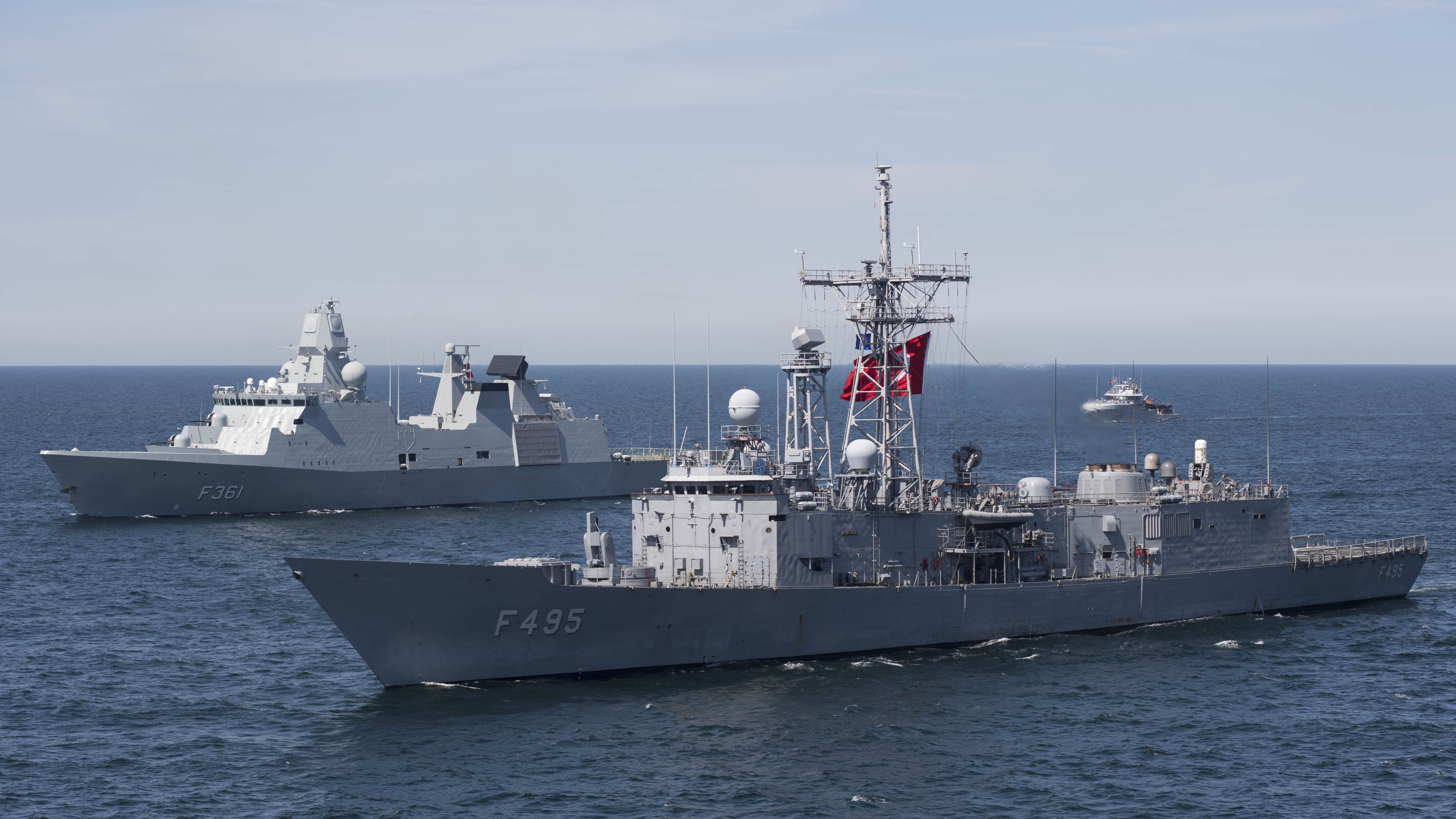
TCG Gediz and HDMS Iver Huitfeldt during BALTOPS '19, on 9 June 2019

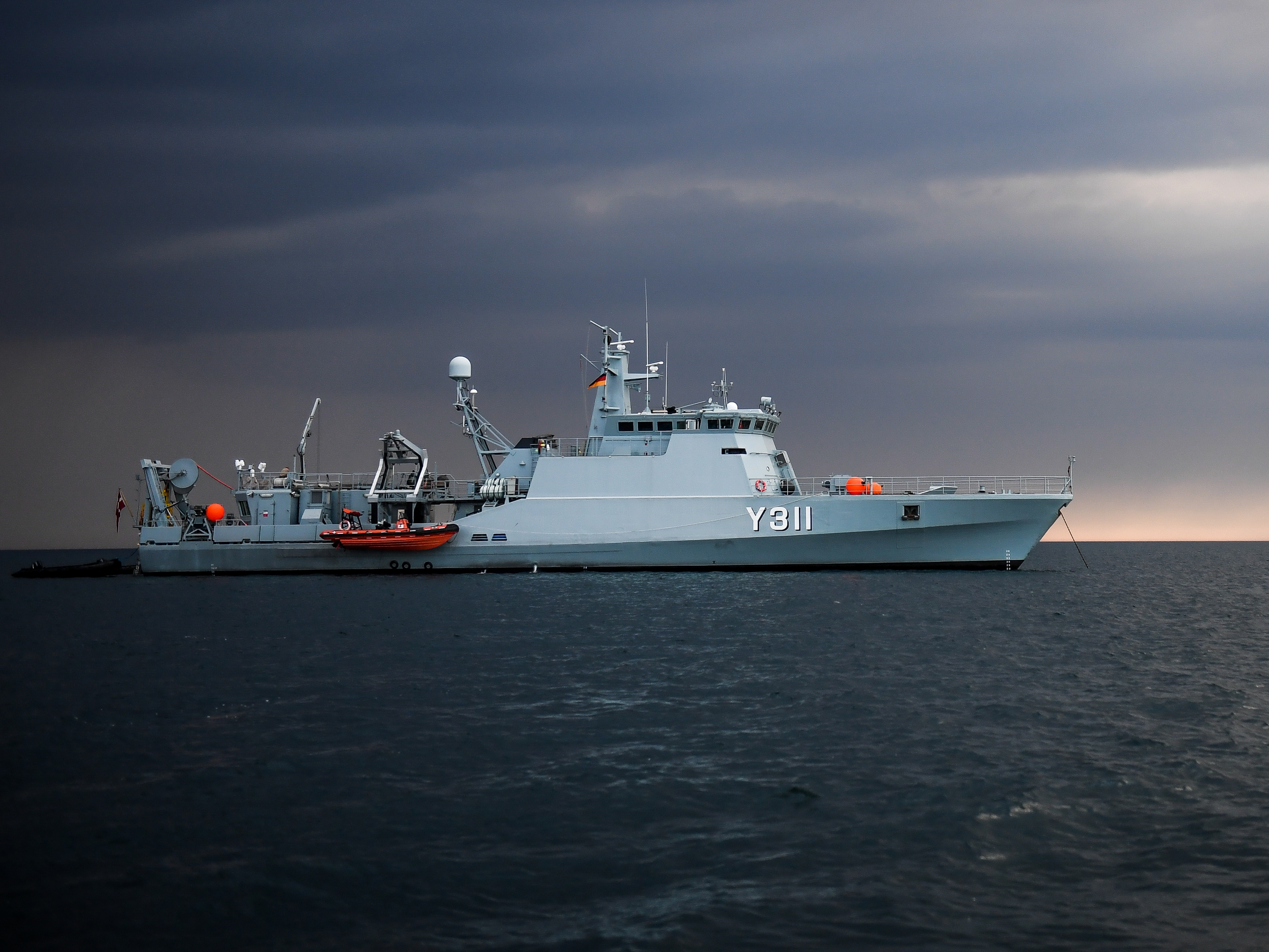
Royal Danish Navy patrol vessel Søløven at anchor during BALTOPS '19, on 16 June 2019

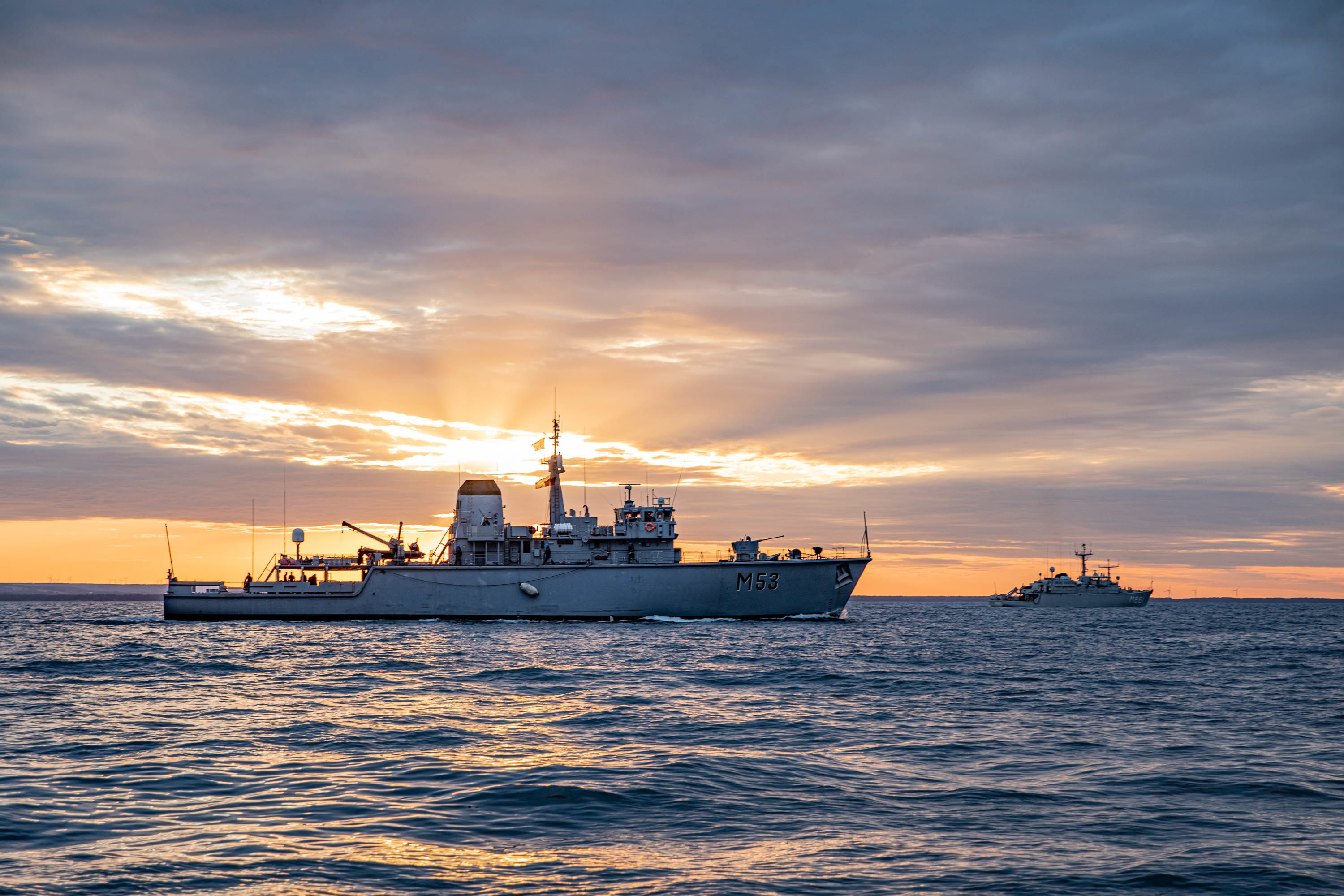
Lithuanian Navy Hunt-class mine-hunter Skalvis during BALTOPS '20

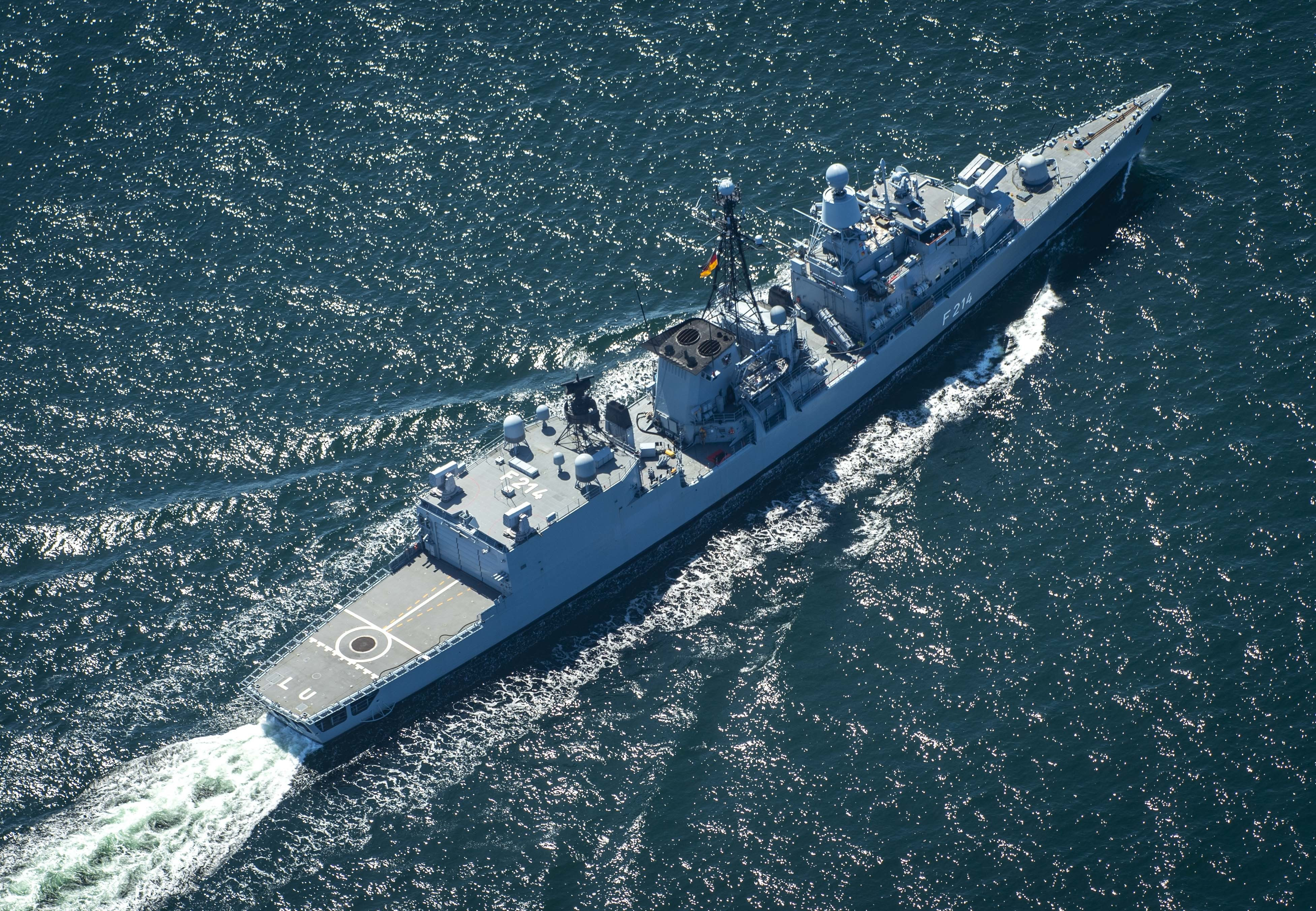
German Navy frigate Lübeck underway during BALTOPS '20, on 8 June 2020
