= Kendall Snow =

American politician

Member of New Hampshire House of Representatives for Hillsborough 19
- In office December 5, 2018 – December 7, 2022
- Preceded by: Joel Elber

Personal details
- Party: Democratic

Kendall A. Snow is an American politician. He was a member of the New Hampshire House of Representatives and represented the Hillsborough 19th district.
