= Joel Elber =

American politician

Member of New Hampshire House of Representatives for Hillsborough 19
- In office 2016–2018
- Succeeded by: Kendall Snow

Personal details
- Party: Democratic
- Education: Salem State College
- Alma mater: Northeastern University

Joel Elber is an American politician. He was a member of the New Hampshire House of Representatives and represented Hillsborough 19th district.
