= German ship Elbe =

Elbe-class replenishment ship

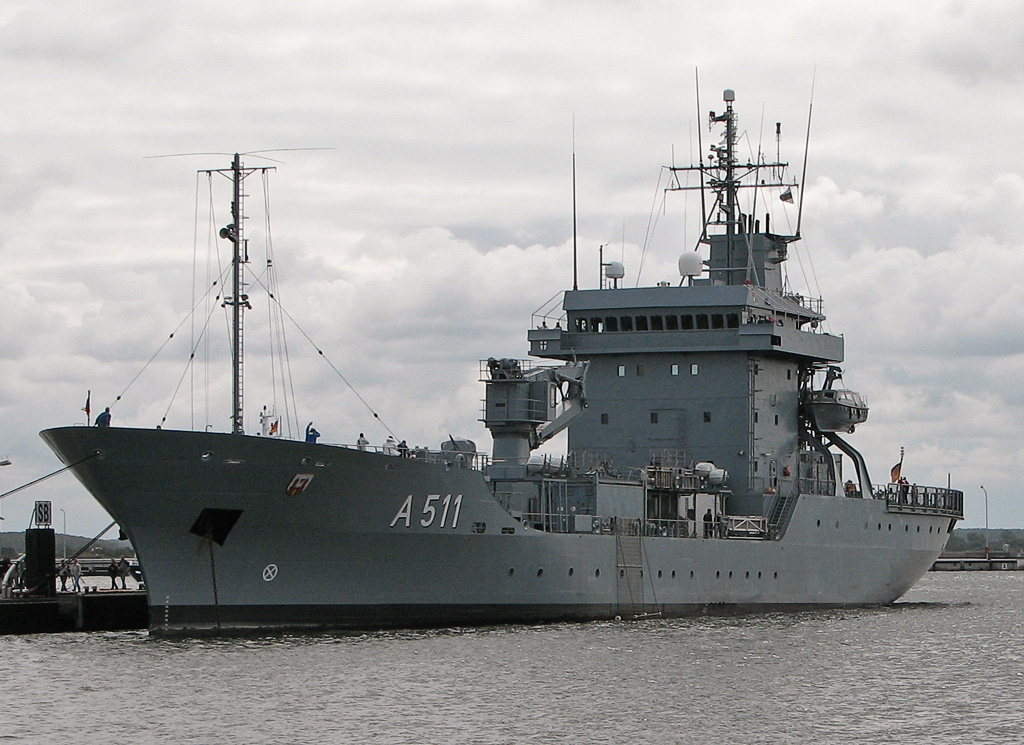
- Elbe on 13 August 2005

History

Germany
- Name: Elbe
- Namesake: Elbe
- Builder: Bremer Vulkan
- Launched: June 1992
- Commissioned: 28 January 1993
- Home port: Warnemünde
- Identification: MMSI number: 211211480; Callsign: DRHJ; Pennant number: A511
- Status: Active

General characteristics
- Type: Elbe-class replenishment ship
- Displacement: 3,586 tonnes
- Length: 100.55 m (329 ft 11 in)
- Beam: 15.40 m (50 ft 6 in)
- Draft: 4.05 m (13 ft 3 in)
- Propulsion: 1 × Deutz-MWM SBV diesel engines; 2,562 kW, Bow thruster
- Speed: 15 knots (28 km/h)
- Range: 2,600 nmi (4,800 km)
- Capacity: 24 standard 6.2 m containers (maximum); Supplies: 700 m³ fuel; 60 m³ aviation (helicopter) fuel; 280 m³ fresh water; 160 tonnes ammunition; 40 tonnes supplies; Disposal: 5 tonnes solid waste; 180 m³ waste water; 32 m³ waste oil
- Complement: 40 (standard) + >38 (repair party, passengers, squadron staff)
- Armament: 2 × Fliegerfaust 2 surface-to-air missile stands (MANPADS); 2 × Rheinmetall Rh202 20 mm autocannon; being replaced by 2 × MLG-27 27 mm remote controlled autocannons
- Aviation facilities: Helipad

Elbe (A511) is the lead ship of the Elbe-class replenishment ships of the German Navy.

== Development ==
The Elbe-class replenishment ships are also known tenders of the German Navy. In German, this type of ship is called Versorgungsschiffe which can be translated as "supply ship" though the official translation in English is "replenishment ship".

They are intended to support German naval units away from their home ports. The ships carry fuel, provisions, ammunition and other matériel and also provide medical services. The ships are named after German rivers where German parliaments were placed.

== Construction and career ==
Elbe was launched in June 1992 in Bremen-Vegesack, Germany. She was commissioned on 28 January 1993.

Elbe had moved from its home base in Rostock-Warnemünde to Kiel on 14 July 2016 to join forces with the Sakala from Estonia and Skalvis from Lithuania. On 18 July, the ships then set sail together for the Baltic Sea to later join the standing NATO mine countermeasures group SNMCMG 1 (Standing NATO Mine Countermeasures Group 1). The tender Elbe is now the operations center for the international task force.

== Gallery ==
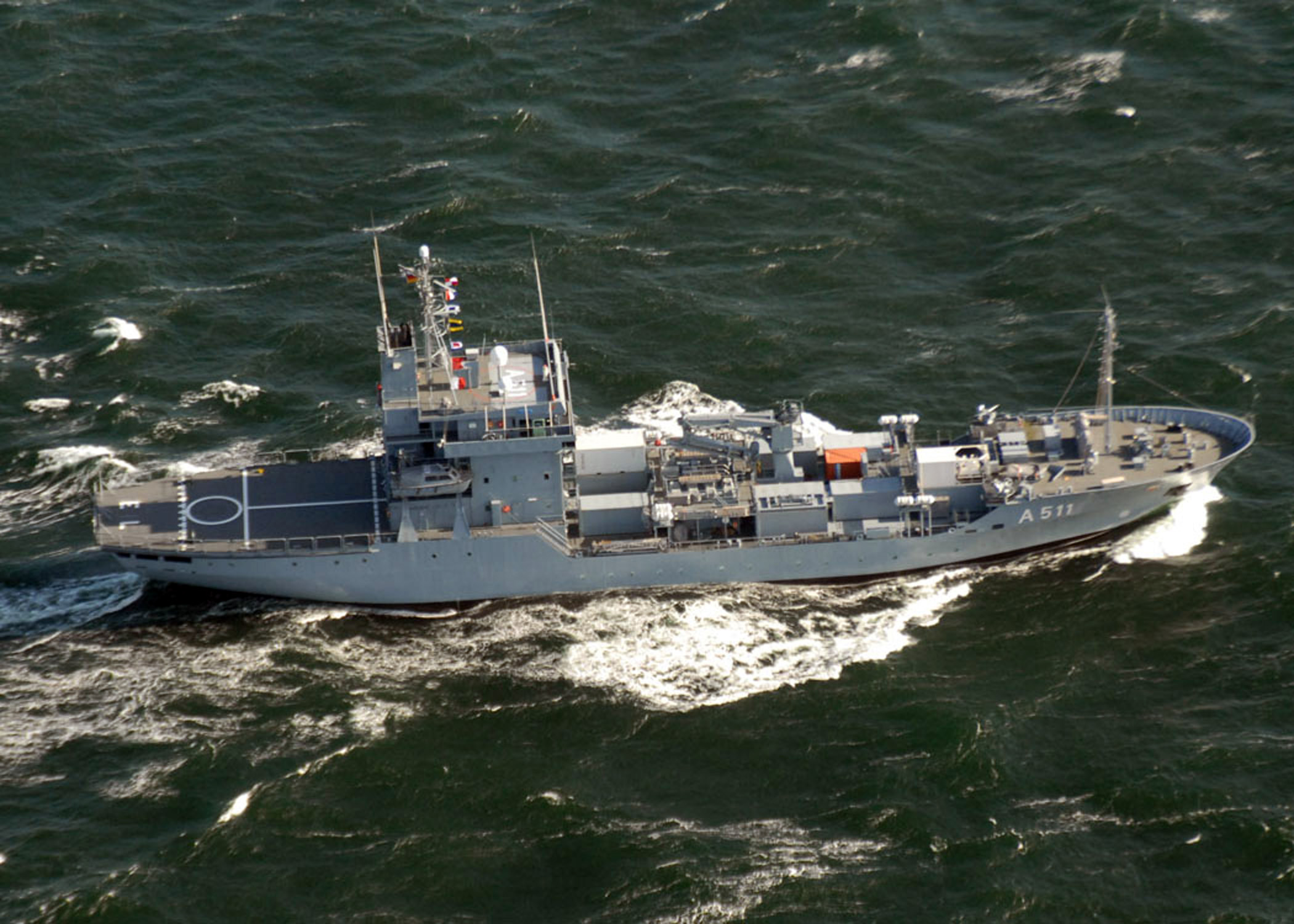
Elbe during BALTOPS on 11 June 2008

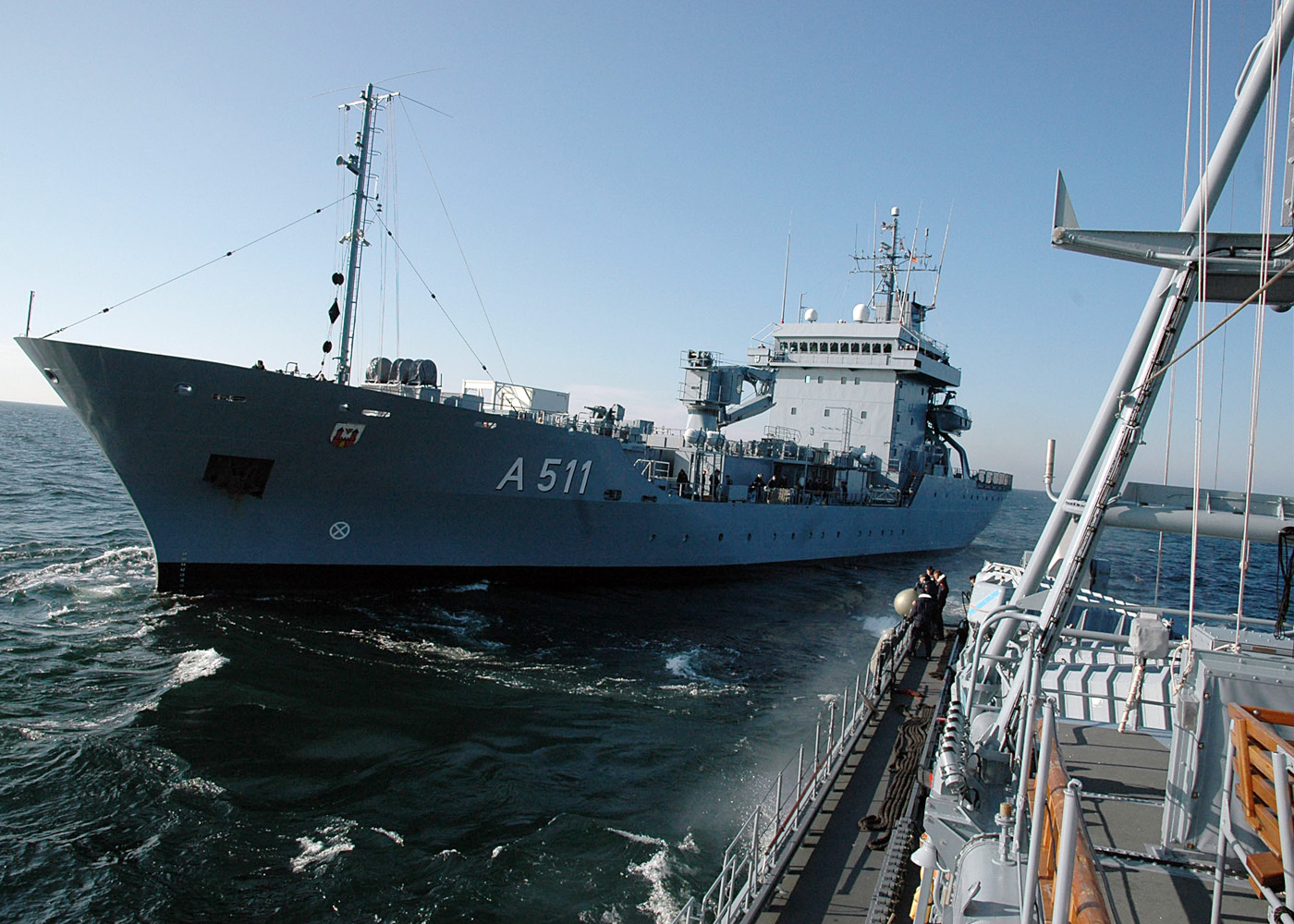
Elbe during BALTOPS on 10 June 2009

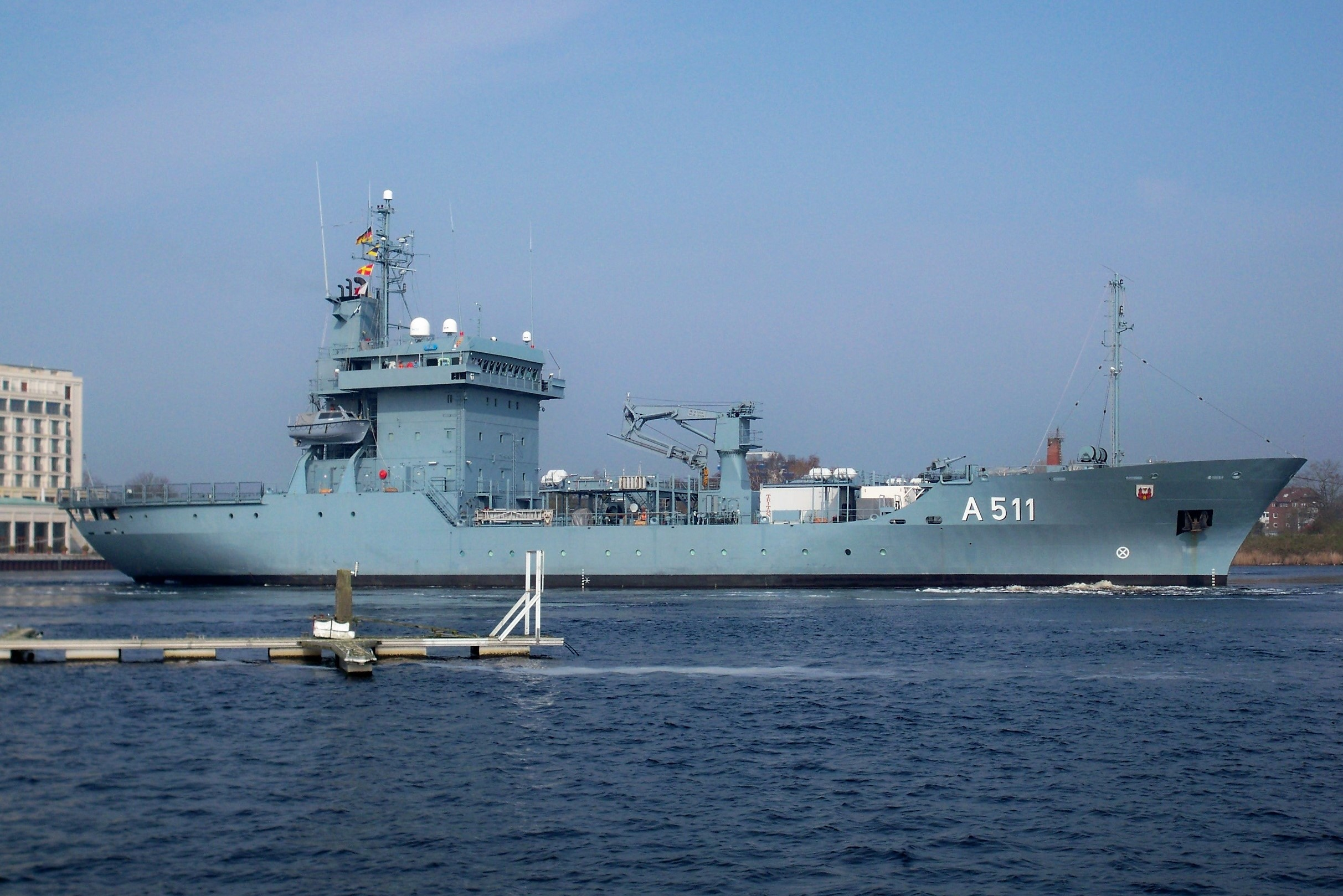
Elbe in Wilhelmshaven on 3 April 2014

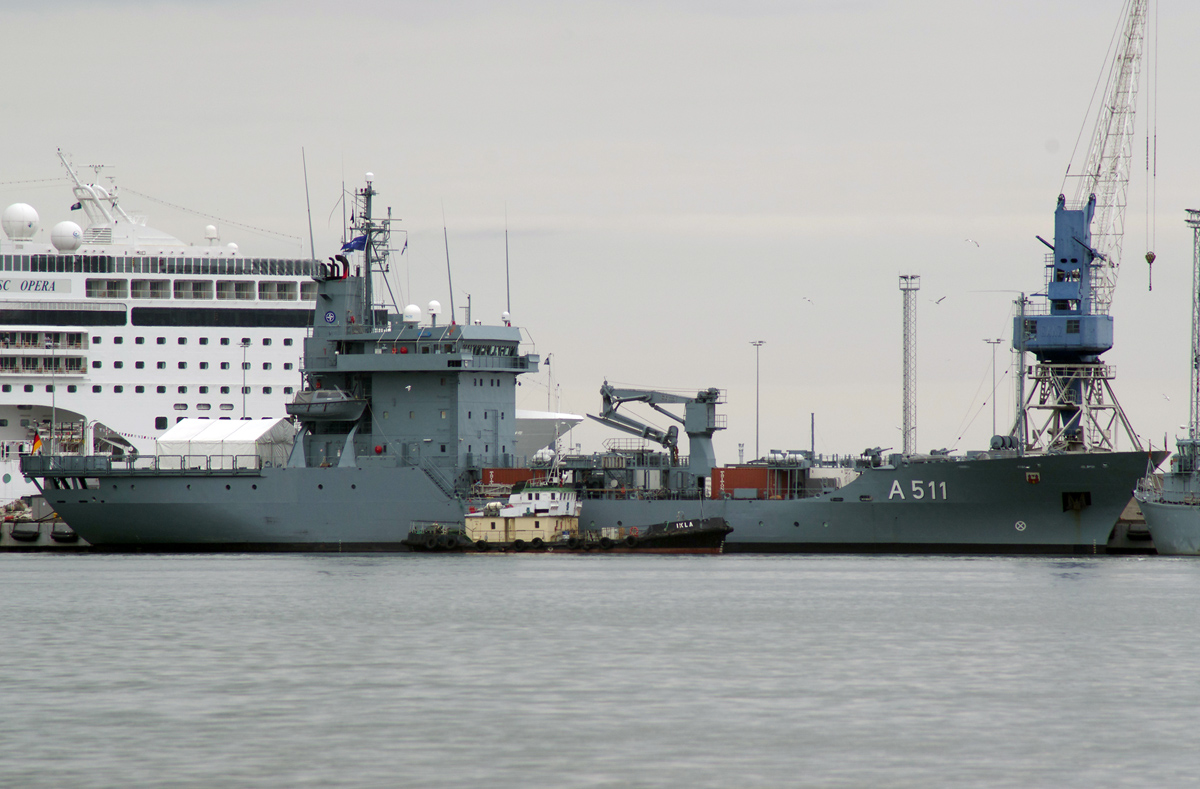
Elbe in Port of Tallinn on 30 May 2014

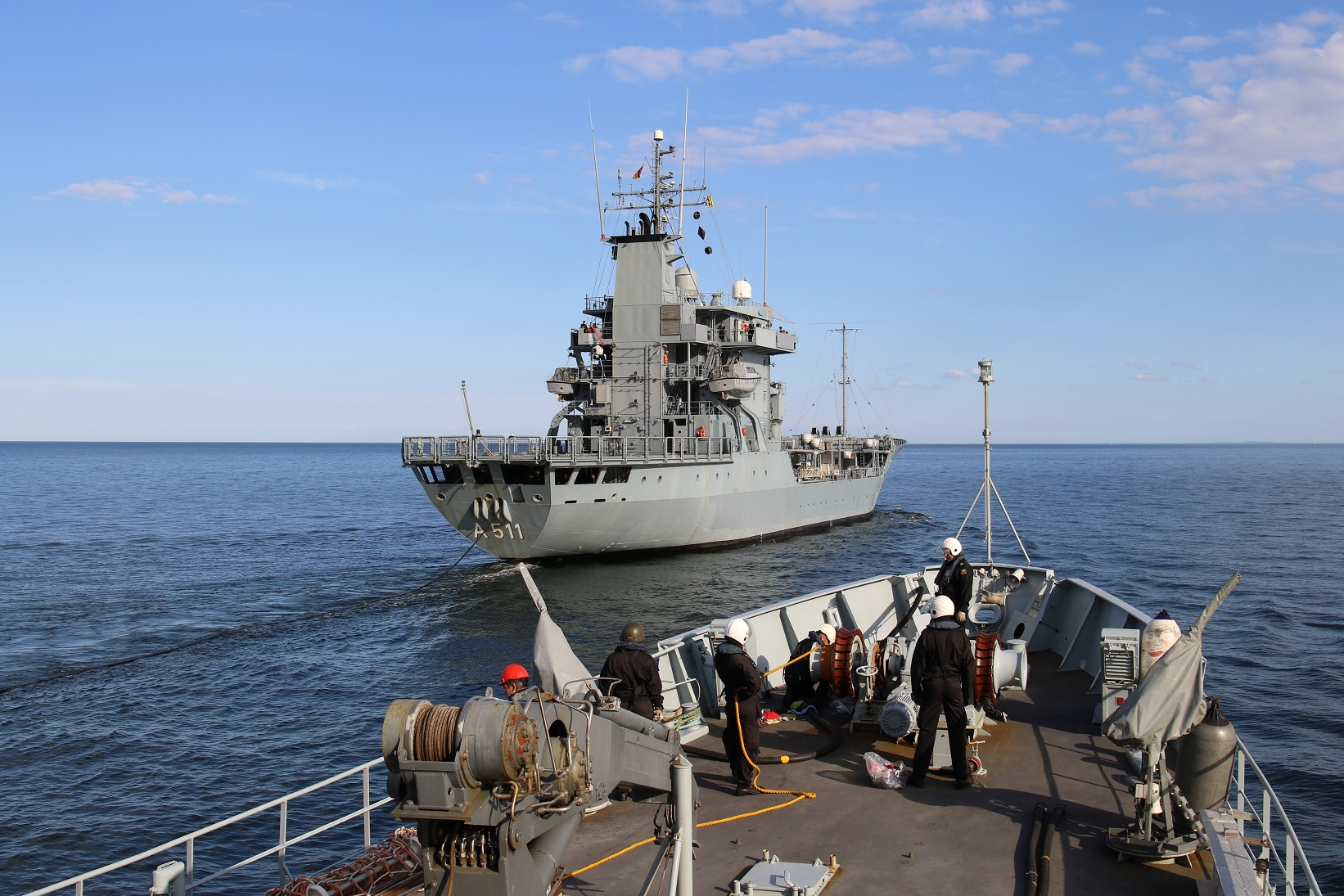
Elbe during BALTOPS on 5 June 2017

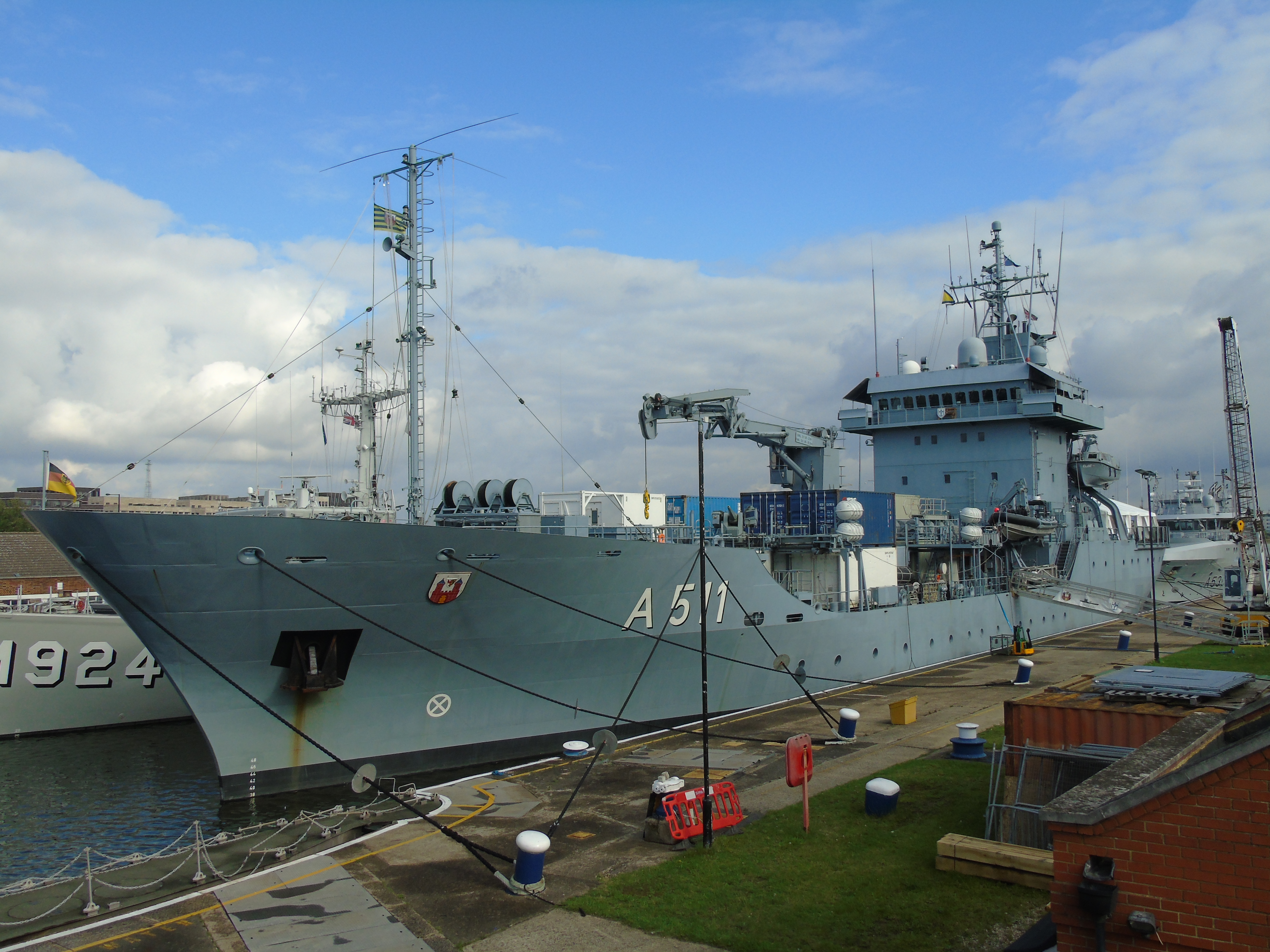
Elbe in King George V Dock during SNMCMG2 in October 2021
