= SS Elbe =

Steamships named Elbe include:

- SS Elbe (1881), a Norddeutscher Lloyd ship sunk in 1895
- SS Elbe (1921), a Bugsier Reederei & Bergungs ship in service 1921–1945
