= Jef Elbers =

- Born: 19 September 1947 (age 78); Brussels, Belgium
- Occupations: political activist, script writer, singer

Jef Elbers (born 19 September 1947) is a Flemish singer, script writer, and political activist.

== 1947–1973 ==
=== Childhood, Studies, music talent scouting ===
Jef Elbers’ was born in Brussels, the son of a Ukrainian mother. His father, a Brussels citizen, worked as head of department at the national telegraph and telephone company (RTT) and his mother was a housewife. His parents survived the Nazi concentration camps: his father ended up there as a prisoner of war, while his Ukrainian mother, as Untermensch, was a victim of the racial policy of Nazi Germany. This makes him a so-called victim of the second generation.

Jef Elbers attended the Jesuit College, studying Latin and Sciences. He was married, but is now divorced. He has 5 children. In 1973 he won a talent competition, hosted by radio station Omroep Brabant from the broadcasting network of the Belgian Radio and Television. This is the beginning of a career as a singer, which leads to the production, between 1973 and 1984, of 6 long players.

=== Early involvement in politics within the Flemish movement ===
Elbers' involvement in politics was shaped in reaction to the attitudes of Brussels' francophone upper classes, who tended to perceive the Flemish as the equivalent of foreign workers. In this, he followed in the path of his ancestor Ferdinand Elbers, secretary of the Brussels federation of the Belgian Labour Party (POB-BWP) who, due to the language problems within the federation, asked in 1901: "Comrades, don't you think a Flemish Member of Parliament becomes necessary in our district, composed of 125 municipalities of which 112 are exclusively Dutch. We do our duty by pointing out that, outside the capital, we are asked to designate a Flemish representative, and that the Federation would act very judiciously in the future by designating a representative able to speak and to write the language of the people outside of the Brussels district."

At the age of 16, Elbers, who, in his songs, appears to be a bohemian and anti-bourgeois, became a member of the Order of Flemish militants (VMO), an activist group, to participate in a more structured way to the Flemish resistance. At the age of 19, he went to Canada to harvest tobacco. Upon his return, with his brother Wim he brought new life to the inactive department of the People's Union (Volksunie) in Schaerbeek. In 1969, an activist of the so-called Democratic Front of Francophones (FDF) with a not very good health suffers from a heart attack during an action of the VMO. After this incident, the VU seems to dissociate from its activists. Disappointed, Elbers then withdraws from active political life.

== 1973–1992 ==
=== Singing in Brussels dialect and in Dutch ===
In 1973 he won a talent competition, hosted by radio station Omroep Brabant from the broadcasting network of the Belgian Radio and Television. This began his career as a singer, which led to the production, between 1973 and 1984, of 6 long players.

From 1974 onwards, Elbers starts to be appreciated as a singer with a repertoire in the Brussels dialect. Recurring themes in his texts become the destruction of Brussels and Elbers’ sympathy for the Flemish proletarian. His most famous song is Leopold II, a song in which he treats these two subjects. On the one hand, it is a song about a homeless tramp, wandering around in Brussels, who physically resembles the second Belgian king; on the other hand, the singer took the opportunity to deplore the "decline" of his hometown. In the meantime, the Egmont Pact of 1977, which was a political pact between the majority parties under the government of prime minister Leo Tindemans, further strengthens his aversion to the VU as he considered the concessions this party was prepared to make to obtain the transformation of Belgium into a federal state, unacceptable. Elbers went over to Lode Claes’ Flemish People's Party, then operative especially in the Brussels region. For the Vlaams Blok, the successor of the Flemish People's Party (and of Karel Dillen’s Flemish National Party, which bundled forces on a kartel-list with the first), he became a candidate for the municipal elections of 1988 in Schaerbeek.

In the meantime, in 1978, the singer had moved from the Brussels’ dialect to Dutch. In 1983, he launched his vinyl long player In 't midden van' t gewoel (In the middle of the hustle and bustle). "Very strong, if not virulent in his Flemish protest, was Brussels singer Jef Elbers, who always profiled himself as an illustrious opponent of Belgium", as Peter Notte writes in his (except for Internet) unpublished thesis, while noting that, of all the singers dedicated to the Flemish cause, he probably was the most committed Fleming, while singers such as Wannes Van de Velde stood rather for a more lenient inclination, whereas a group of singers like De Elegasten embodied the superlative that provided Elbers the opportunity to raise the bid. The same year, Jef Elbers wrote a poem in tribute to the leader of the VMO, Bert Eriksson.

=== Script for a television series for young people ===
From the eighties onwards, Jef Elbers had also been working for the Dutch broadcastings of the Belgian Radio and Television (BRT). Under the nom de plume Dick Durver, Elbers wrote scripts for television programs for the youngsters, such as Merlina, Postbus X and Interflix. Merlina is a detective series for children. Initially, the intention was not to make twenty episodes, but finally 95 of them were created. Elbers worked on the program In 't lieg plafon, for the radio, which was broadcast in the Brussels dialect.

In the mid-eighties, Elbers abandoned his career as a singer.

== 1992–2000 ==
=== The board of directors of the BRT ===
Elbers was a board member of his former employer, BRTN, from April 1992 onwards. He was the first representative of the Vlaams Blok, the party for which he was a candidate in municipal elections of 1988 in Schaerbeek. After having been designated as their representative on the board of directors, the Vlaams Blok, stated in February 1992 that it wanted to contribute constructively to the management of the BRTN: ”an institution that has been in the past one of the sharpest opponents of the Vlaams Blok.” The party will ensure that the BRTN won't take up more misinformation, manipulation or interpretation, wishes to promote Flemish citizenship and puts the emphasis on Flemish culture. Jef Elbers states that he wants to work for "a public radio and television nearer to the people, that merits respect, expresses joy to work and gives priority to the own Dutch culture." Elbers is one of the few artists that the party has drawn so far.

Elbers also criticized what he called 'the agency of emancipation' of the BRTN: "This service was established to please Miet Smet and handles so-called 'affirmative action' for women in the House." (Note: BRTN) "This agency of emancipation would do better to investigate why the women of the BRTN are, on average, ill four days longer as their male colleagues, rather than studying with Paula D'Hondt how a foreigner could get a job at the BRTN.”

=== Knokke-Heist and a new set of programs for the youth ===
Having lived many years in Schaerbeek, Jef Elbers moved to and settled in the coastal town Knokke-Heist in 1993, and in December of that year, he became (temporarily) Chairman of the Knokke-Heist Department of the VB.

In 1994, BRTN launches a new series for youngsters, Interflix; a BRTN production made with a small budget and much enthusiasm, according to an article in the newspaper Het Belang van Limburg (The Interest of Limburg). Like Postbus X, Interflix is a mild, both relaxing and exciting soap for young people between 10 and 14 years. The stories, written by Dick Durver/Jef Elbers, are as simple and highly structured as those of popular comics. "Some heroes, of which one is a little bit cleverer than the other, are faced with a situation that causes some small problems. At the end of the episode, the problems are solved: the heroes are the winners and possible culprits bow their head in remorse.” ”If in Merlina, it was still a real detective agency and in Postbus X the office of a newspaper, Interflix is the story of an agency that is organized in a somewhat chaotic way and which attracts a lot of trouble in different ways.”

Elbers, when taking the decision to refocus his activities on making television programs, left the board, since this would not have been compatible with a mandate in the board of the BRTN. In 1996, the Vlaams Blok replaces him as party representative on the board of directors by Inge Vanpaeschen, photographer and City Councilor in Knokke, who had missed her cooptation, as a Senator. Under the pseudonym Telemacho, Elbers wrote for the TV section of the magazine ‘t Pallieterke.

== 2000 and after ==
=== Freedom of speech and artistic freedom in question ===
During the 2000 municipal elections, Jef Elbers, being ineligible candidate on the list of VB said: ”Knokke-Heist is a tourist town. We are fully aware that there is a large colony of speakers of another language. Despite this, Knokke-Heist can not be a municipality with language facilities. Hospitality and courtesy are not identical to commercial servility ..."

The same year, Jef Elbers is summoned before the criminal court because of his song ‘Mohammed Ambras’, which had immediately been declared to be of a racist tendency by the Flemish newspaper De Morgen (The Morning). The song was written in response to the riots caused by immigrants in November 1997. It began with the words: ”I recently saw, in Anderlecht, the reality of the intifada; a bunch of brown hooligans engaged in the worst excess". Turns of the phrase such as "The underprivileged again made a race in their BMW’s in Schaerbeek" and "There has been stolen, in many stores; the police only made everything wet", were regarded as offensive and an enticement to racial hatred. The Prosecutor, Kathleen Desaegher, claimed the Internet was accessible to everyone and the song could be read and heard on the website of the Vlaams Blok Youth (VBJ) in 1997. Elbers states that he was not asked permission to put the song on the site, but that he would certainly have given his consent if he had been asked beforehand. Philip Claeys too stood trial. Being at that time president of the VBJ, he took responsibility for the content of the site. The case began with an official report by the brigade of the national police after a complaint had been made by a visitor to the site. Elbers, who didn't deny being the author of the song in question, suggested to the judge to sing the song. The judge didn't consider this to be necessary. The prosecutor believed that writer Elbers and editor Claeys violated the legislation on racism using phrases such as "a bunch of brown scum demolished everything."

As the song would have been widely distributed via the website, Prosecutor Desaegher considered the intention of encouraging xenophobia been proven. She required an effective sentence of imprisonment of five months. The defence requested to suspend the trial. A lawyer who pleaded Claeys's cause, alleged that the criminal court was not competent for a "violation of press laws" dating from 1997. It was not until 1999 that an exception was made to the law that provides that violations of the laws governing the Press – including those violations tainted with racism – should appear immediately before the Assize Court. To apply this exception retroactively would undermine the principle of equality. The song had meanwhile vanished from the website. Counsel then asked the discharge of their clients. Lawyer Verreycken drew an image of Elbers as someone who made very polemic songs since the seventies. He wrote the Ballad of the Rats in which he compares the French-speaking in Brussels to these animals.

Late 2000, Jef Elbers and former president of the VBJ, Philip Claeys, are acquitted. The prosecutor had demanded five months of actual imprisonment. The court followed the reasoning of the singer who had argued that the protest song was criticizing the failure of the migration policy of Paula D'Hondt. "It was only a song and not a scientific work, which means there is little room for fine distinctions. You can argue about the lack of artistic value or taste, but the court has not to interfere in these matters. There is no racism", say the judges. "I was always taught at school: read what has been written. That’s what the prosecutor should have done as well. This verdict; I do not think it to be a victory. This trial should never have taken place. Do they really have nothing else to do?", Jef Elbers replied.

=== The CPAS, the parliamentary elections and a new book ===
On the occasion of the installation in 2001 of the Board of the Public Center for Social Well-being in Knokke-Heist, the Vlaams Blok expresses its discontent through its representative, Councillor Jef Elbers, for the fact that the largest opposition party was excluded from all committees. At the Board meeting, representatives of different political parties within these committees should have been appointed, but due to an agreement between the Flemish Socialist Party (SP), and RAAK, the VB was banned from all committees. Elbers said the council is a bunch of hypocrites and refused at the end of the session to appear on the photo of the group. He remained as a Councillor until January 2007.

Jef Elbers, an assiduous writer of letters to the editor, gave his analysis of the legislative elections of 10 June 2007 for his party in a writer's letter in the Flemish satirical weekly 't Pallieterke: "The Vlaams Belang lost the elections. [...] This downward spiral can only be stopped if the Vlaams Belang is what the Vlaams Blok has previously been: a party not in favour of the established order.”

In April 2008, Elbers presents his latest book, De Poorters van Babel (the citizens of Babel), in Knokke-Heist.

== Personal life ==
Elbers’ parents were both survivors of the Nazi concentration camps; his father, a Belgian citizen, had been a prisoner of war, while his mother, a Ukrainian Slav, had been classified as Untermensch.

Jef Elbers attended the Jesuit College, studying Latin and Sciences. He was married, but is now divorced. He has 5 children.

== Selected discography ==
- World Trade Center, vinyl LP album – 1974, Omega International – 163 030
- Er zijn geen bomen in mijn straat (no trees in my street), vinyl LP album – 1975, Omega International – 163 016
- De donderdagman (the man on Thursday), vinyl LP album – 1976, Omega International – 143001
- Met de dood in het hart (death in the soul), LP Vinyl Album – 1978 Philips – 6320 038
- De zevende dag (the seventh day), LP Vinyl Album – 1979 Philips – 6320 049
- In 't midden van' t gewoel (in the middle of the hustle and bustle), LP Vinyl Album – 1982 Dureco – 88052
- Afspraak met haar (go with her), Single Vinyl 7 – 1981, Tami – 230 655

A complete discography (more singles) is available on the website "Muziekarchief" (music archive)

A video featuring an Elbers song: Eer Vlaanderen vergaat (Before Flanders vanishes) on YouTube

== Television series ==
- Merlina (1983–1988)
- Mik, Mak en Mon (1986–1988)
- Postbus X (early 1990)
- Interflix (1994)

== Literature for children and youth ==
- Merlina's mysterieboek (Merlina's book of mysteries, 1984)
- Marsmannen van Venus (Martians of Venus, 1986)
- Mik, Mak & Mon: gezanten van de Galacton (Mik, Mak & Mon: Ambassadors of Galacton, 1986)
- Het geheim van Sardona (the secret of Sardona, 1990)
- Folder van postbus X (the files in the box X, 1991)

== Novels ==
- Chorwon (1986)
- De Poorters van Babel (The Citizens of Babel, 2008)
- Het Legerkamp der Heiligen (The Camp of the Saints, 2015), Dutch translation of "Le Camp des Saints" by Jean Raspail.
