= Elbe Air =

Corporate charter airline from Germany

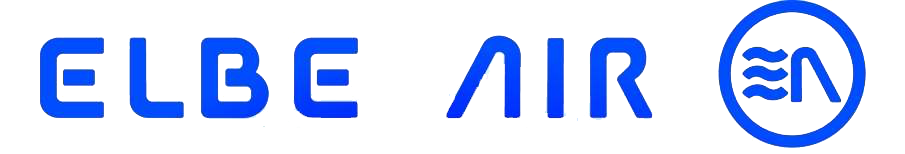

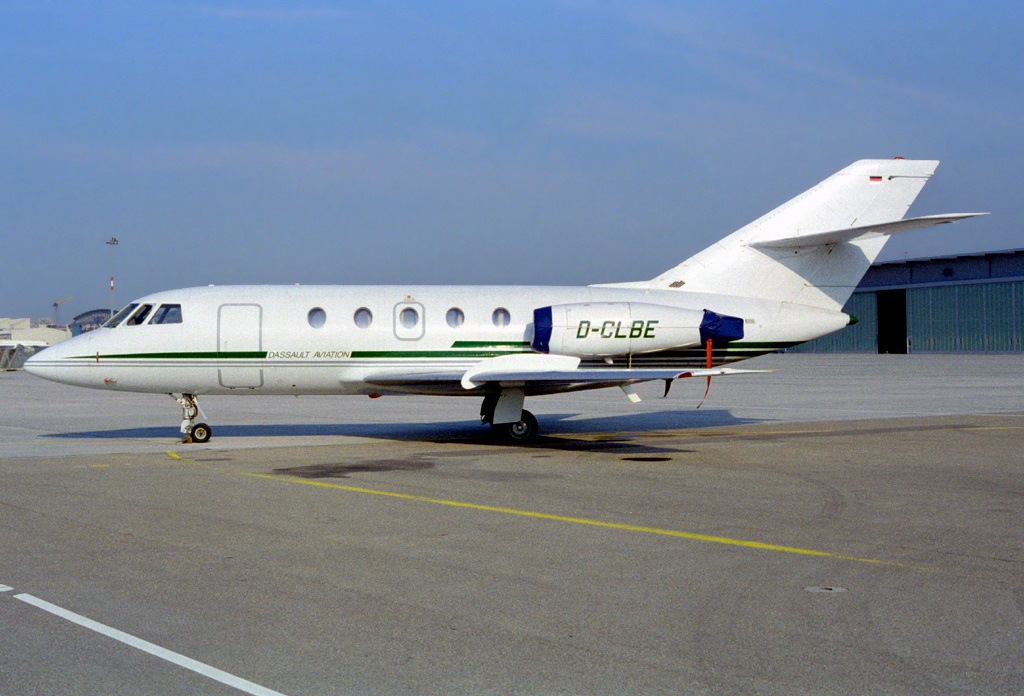
- Dassault Falcon 20
IATA	ICAO	Call sign
-	LBR	MOTION
- Founded: 1995
- Ceased operations: 2008
- Operating bases: Paderborn Lippstadt Airport
- Headquarters: Büren, Westphalia, Germany

Elbe Air Lufttransport GmbH, usually just known as Elbe Air, was a corporate charter airline from Germany, which offered worldwide on-demand flight services. The company was headquartered in Büren, Westphalia and had its operational base at nearby Paderborn Lippstadt Airport.

== History ==
In 2002, Elbe Air operated a fleet of three Dassault Falcon 20 jets. In the same year, reports surfaced about poor safety and security standards with the airline. A former pilot had filed a report with the German Federal Aviation Office, concerning poorly trained pilots and ageing aircraft, which had not been properly maintained.

The airline filed for bankruptcy and was liquidated in 2008.
