= Ferdinand Elbers =

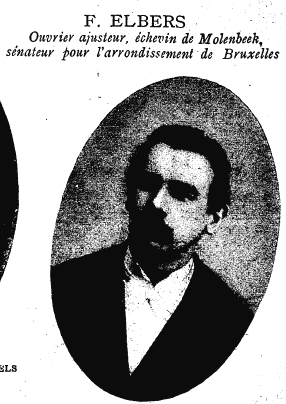
Ferdinand Elbers

Ferdinand Elbers (24 December 1862 in Ghent – 8 August 1943 in Molenbeek) was a Flemish mechanic, trade unionist, and politician. He served as the president of the Brussels federation of the Belgian Workers Party in 1901.

In 1904, he was elected to the Belgian Senate, but his election was ruled void and he was denied his seat. The next year however, he was elected as provincial senator for Brabant, and held that position until 1912. In 1912, he was elected to the Belgian Parliament, where he served until 1929.

In 1896 he was elected to the council of Molenbeek, and was an alderman from 1900 to 1912; he returned to the Molenbeek council in 1926.

His great-grand-nephew is Jef Elbers.

== Sources ==
- History of the Belgian Syndicalist Movement (1918-1940) (in French)
- Oorlog aan de oorlog !? De houding van de Belgische Werkliedenpartij ten aanzien van het leger 1885 -- 1914" (in Dutch)
