= Riverine Flotilla of the Polish Navy =

Interwar era branch of the Polish military

- Flotylla Rzeczna Marynarki Wojennej
- Active: 19 April 1919 – September 1939
- Allegiance: Second Polish Republic
- Branch: Polish Navy
- Type: Inland flotilla
- Engagements: Polish–Soviet War 1919-1921; Invasion of Poland 1939

The Riverine Flotilla of the Polish Navy (Polish: Flotylla Rzeczna Marynarki Wojennej), better known as the Pinsk Flotilla, was the inland branch of the Polish Navy operating on the Vistula river and in the area of the Pinsk Marshes (Dnieper–Bug Canal) between the Polish–Bolshevik War and World War II. Under Commodore Witold Zajączkowski, it was active in the invasion of Poland and fought against both German and Soviet forces.

== Flotilla in the Polish-Bolshevik War of 1920 ==
During the Polish-Bolshevik War the Pinsk Marshes proved to be almost impassable to troops of both sides. Lack of roads and railways posed a serious danger to infantry and cavalry that could easily be cut off both by the enemy and the weather. Because of that, a number of river monitors were either constructed or acquired from private owners and armed. They were used on the Pripyat River, as well as its extensive river basin.

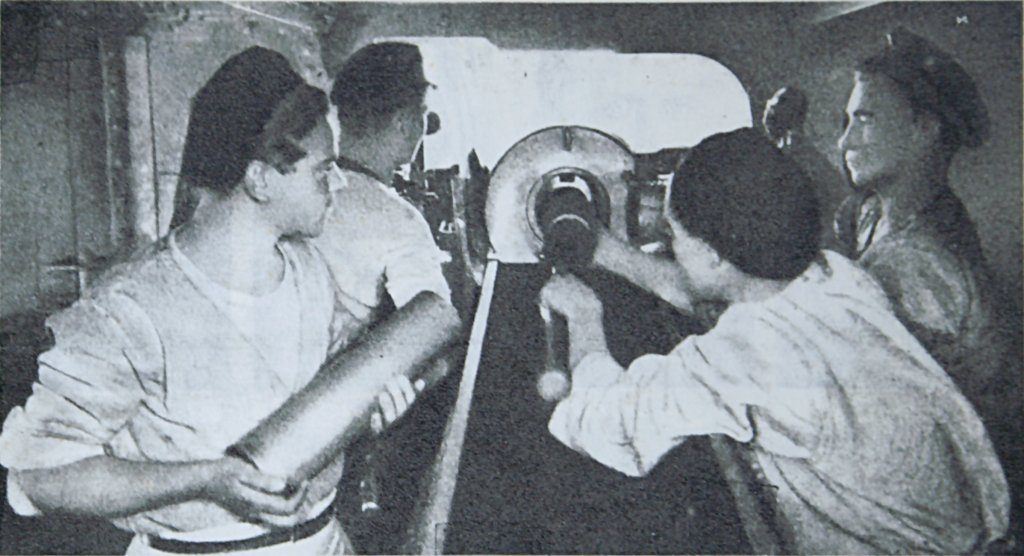
The interior of a gun turret during a pre-war exercise.

Naval Ensign of Poland (1919–1928)

In March 1920, the flotilla took part in the capture of Mozyr, where new units captured from the Dnieper Flotilla were incorporated into its composition. Then the flotilla took part in the Kiev offensive, during which on April 27, during the fighting in the Chernobyl area, it led to the displacement of the Russians to the Dnieper. Then the flotilla took part in the creation of bridgeheads on the left bank of the Dnieper in Kiev and in the parade in that city. After the capture of new ships, the Kiev Flotilla was formed, operating on the Dnieper. During the Bolshevik counteroffensive at the end of May, part of the Pinsk Flotilla was cut off from the main forces, as a result of which the crews sank the ships on June 13, 1920. The surviving units fought during the retreat in the waters of Pripyat, but some, due to the low water level, were sunk in Pinsk and near Koczanowicze. The flotilla was disbanded on August 2, 1920, due to the occupation of the Pripyat basin by the Red Army and the self-sinking of most of the vessels.

After the war, some of the ships were returned to their owners, the rest remained on active service and were pressed into the so-called Pinsk Flotilla.

== Flotilla after the Treaty of Riga ==
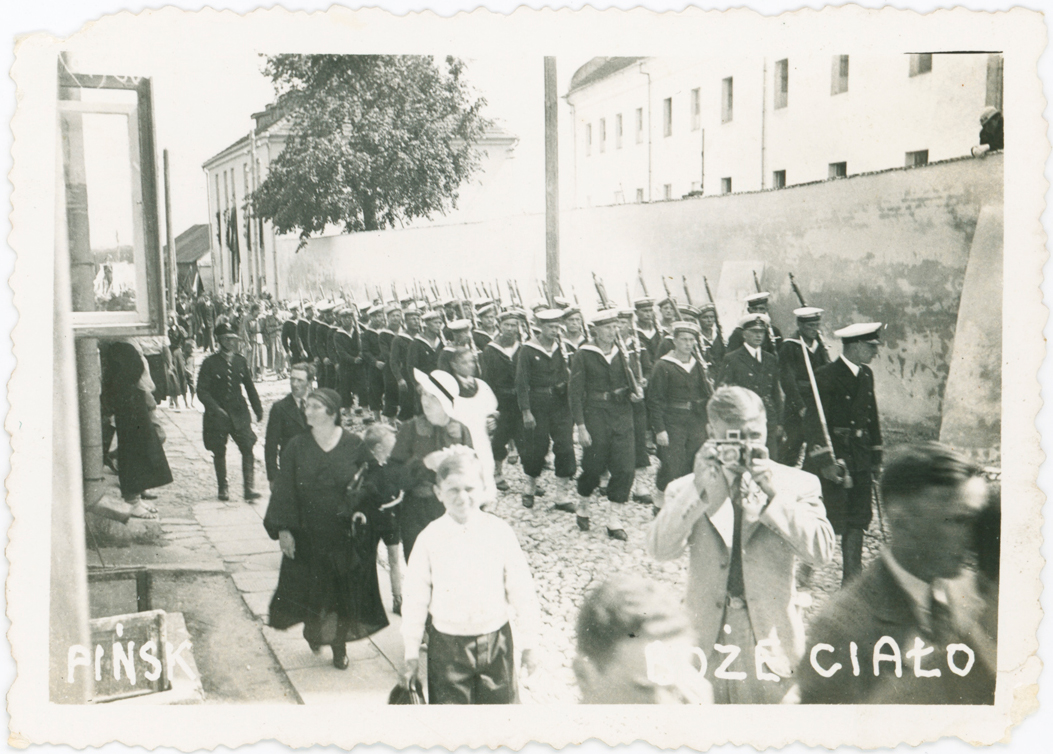
Polish sailors in Pinsk

In peace-time the Riverine Flotilla of the Polish Navy, as it was officially called, operated on the Pina River (Dnieper–Bug Canal), as well as on the Pripyat and the Strumień rivers. It served as a mobile reserve of the Border Defense Corps and was to support the front in case of a war with the Soviet Union. Prior to the invasion of Poland, a number of ships of the Riverine Flotilla were moved to the Vistula as a detachment and became Oddział Wydzielony Rzeki Wisły, better known as the Vistula Flotilla.

== Invasion of 1939 ==
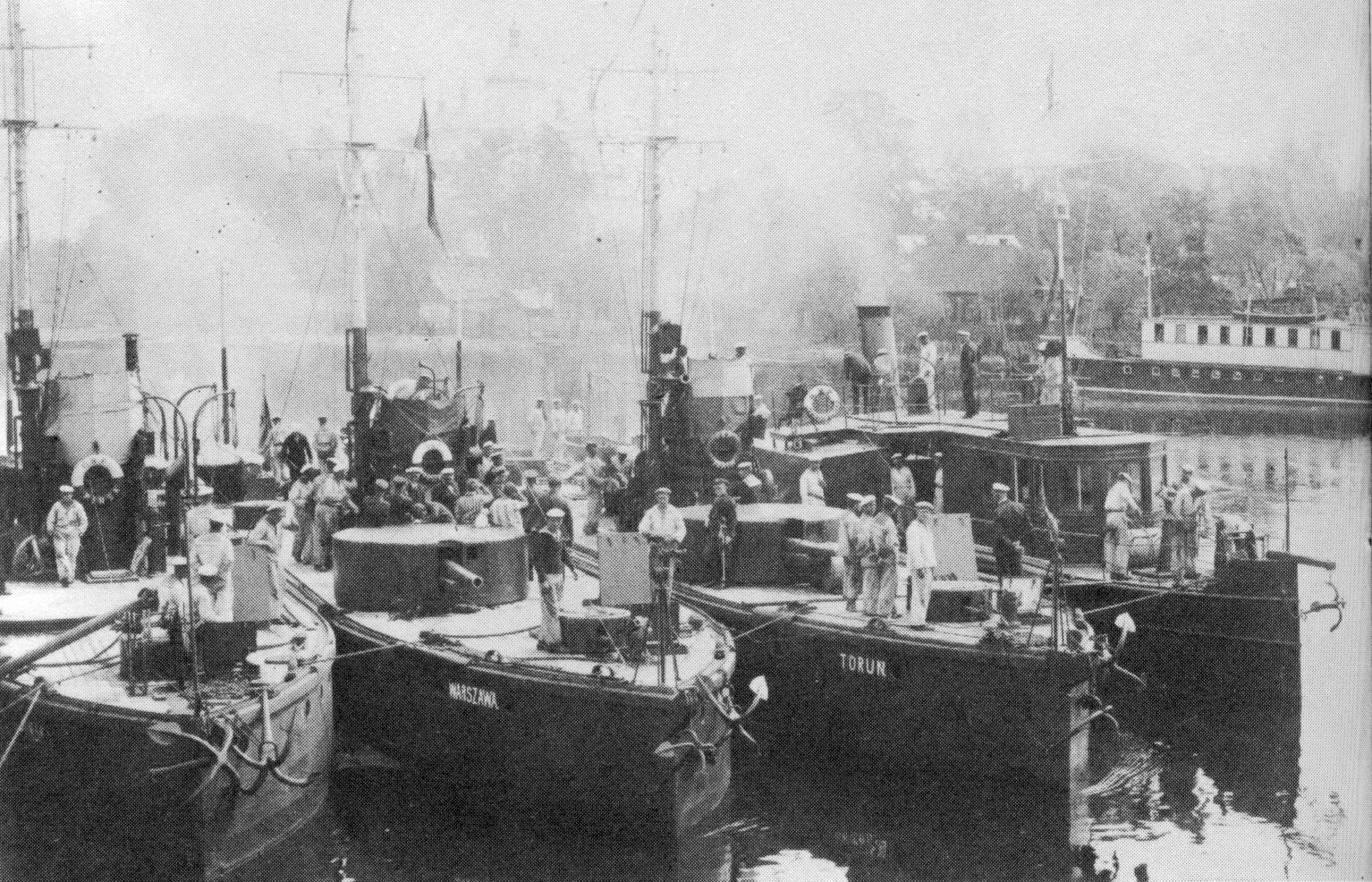
Polish Warszawa-class river monitors in Pinsk.

In the Polish operational plans, the Pinsk flotilla was to form a mobile strategic reserve of the Polish Army in the area and was to constitute the core of the forces defending the area of the Pinsk Marshes. The Polish commander-in-chief and Marshal of Poland, Edward Rydz-Śmigły, forecast that the area would be used for a last stand by the Polish Army, where it would await the relief on the western front from Poland's allies. However the Invasion of Poland on September 1, 1939, made the plans obsolete.

In September 1939, the Flotilla (without the Vistula River Detachment) consisted of 6 river monitors, 3 river gunboats, 4 armed ships, 17 armed cutters (including 3 service cutters and 1 artillery reconnaissance and communications cutter), 2 reporting cutters, 7 river minesweepers and a mine-gas ship, and 48-50 auxiliary units, including 32 scows, a hospital ship, 2 tugs, several motorboats and 6 speedboats. All units were sunk on the orders of General Franciszek Kleeberg in 1939. From 25 September to 12 November, the emergency and rescue service of the Dnieper Flotilla and the EPRON rescue and underwater works company recovered at least 54 of them, including 26 combat ships (5 monitors, 2 gunboats, 15 armed cutters, a mine-gas ship and 3 minesweepers), which were then incorporated into the WFD after repairs and rearmament.

On 10–14 September 1939, on the basis of the reserve battalion (mobilised from 31 August) and the Landing Unit (established on 2 August), two naval battalions were formed, consisting of dismounted cadets from the Naval Cadet School in Gdynia and reserve sailors. The battalion commanders were Commander Pawłowski and Capt. Mar. Marian Foltyn (initially Lt. Mar. Władysław Galiński). The sailors were changed into the field uniforms of the land forces, the officers and senior officer cadets kept their garrison sailor caps, the younger officer cadets and reservists mostly put the Navy eagles on their field caps on their own initiative.

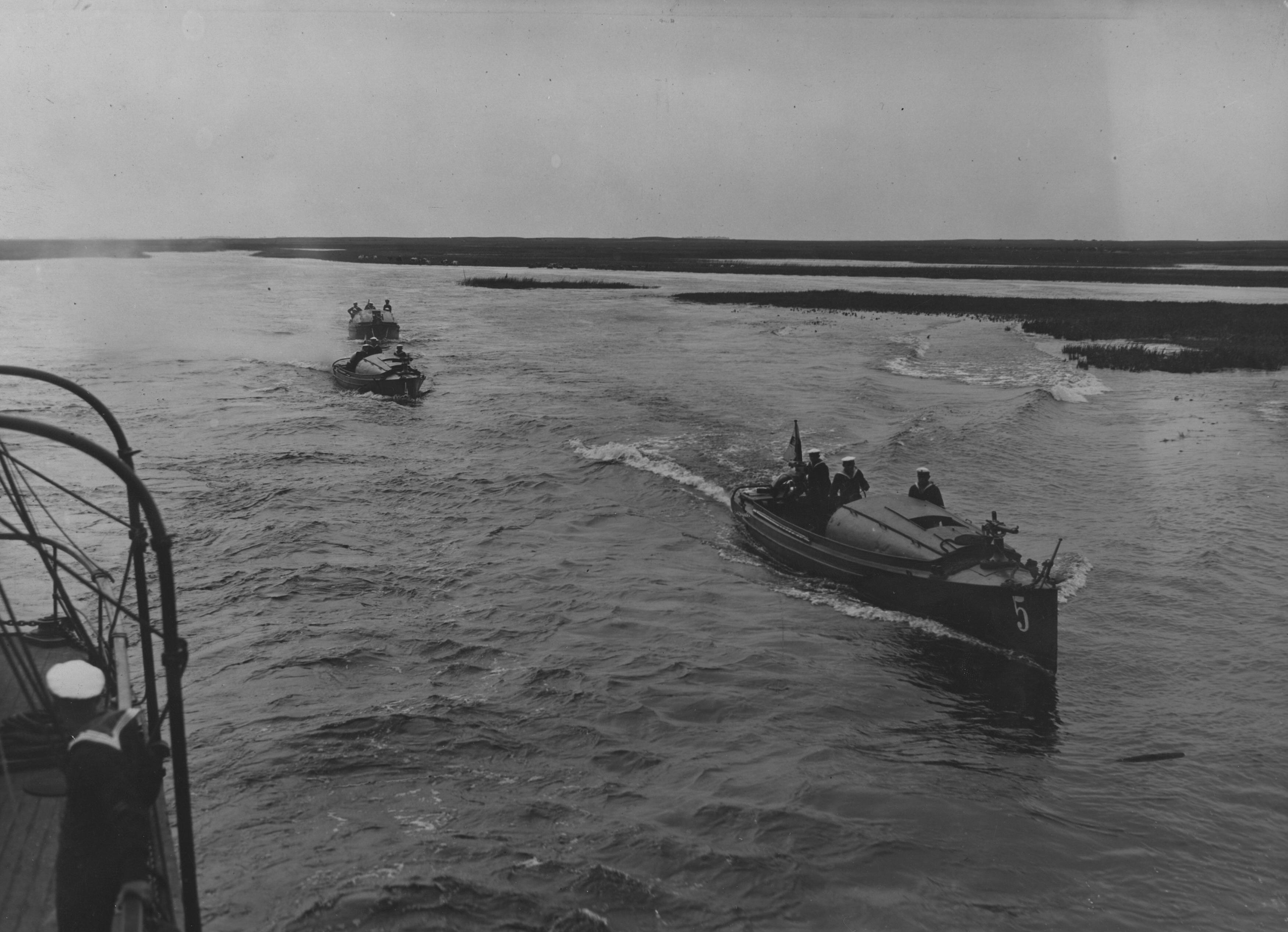
Armed craft of Polish Pina Flotilla, first: KU 5.

On September 20, after sinking the floating units, the majority of the Flotilla's personnel marched on the orders of General Kleeberg towards Lubieszów and Włodawa, with the intention of breaking through towards Romania. On September 22, General Kleeberg, deprived of contact with the command, decided to march to the aid of Warsaw. On September 28, he changed the name of his troops to SGO "Polesie".

After the departure, in accordance with Kleeberg's order, of the few who doubted the purpose of further fighting and some sailors of Ukrainian and Belarusian nationality, the reorganization of the naval battalions took place, which on September 28, together with other sailors, joined the 182nd Infantry Regiment of the 60th Infantry Division as the 3rd "naval" battalion. The battalion commander was 2nd Lt. Commander Stefan Kamiński, the company commanders were Capt. Mar. Lucjan Rabenda, Artillery Captain Jerzy Wojciechowski and Infantry Captain Jan Lipecki. The quartermaster was 2nd Lt. Commander Alojzy Pawłowski. In addition, the 4th company of the independent battalion of the 179th Infantry Regiment of this division was created from the sailors (commander - 2nd Lt. Mar. Bohdan Korsak). Some of the flotilla sailors did not join SGO "Polesie", but joined the KOP Group of Brig. Gen. Wilhelm Orlik-Rückemann, forming a joint naval battalion under the command of: Lieutenant Commander Henryk Eibl, Captain Mar. Edmund Jodkowski and Captain Art. Bogusław Rutyński. Most of them were taken prisoner by the Soviets on the night of 25/26 September, with several dozen being murdered the next day in Mokrany.

During actions against the Soviets and the Germans, most of the ships were scuttled by their crews to avoid capture. In 1939-40 most of them were refloated, repaired, rearmed and included in the Soviet Pinsk Naval Flotilla (1940). They took an active part in battles of World War II but were mostly destroyed in 1941.

== See also ==
- Polish Navy
- Order of Battle of the Riverine Flotilla of the Polish Navy
- Vessels of Polish Riverine Flotilla
