= List of town tramway systems in Belarus =

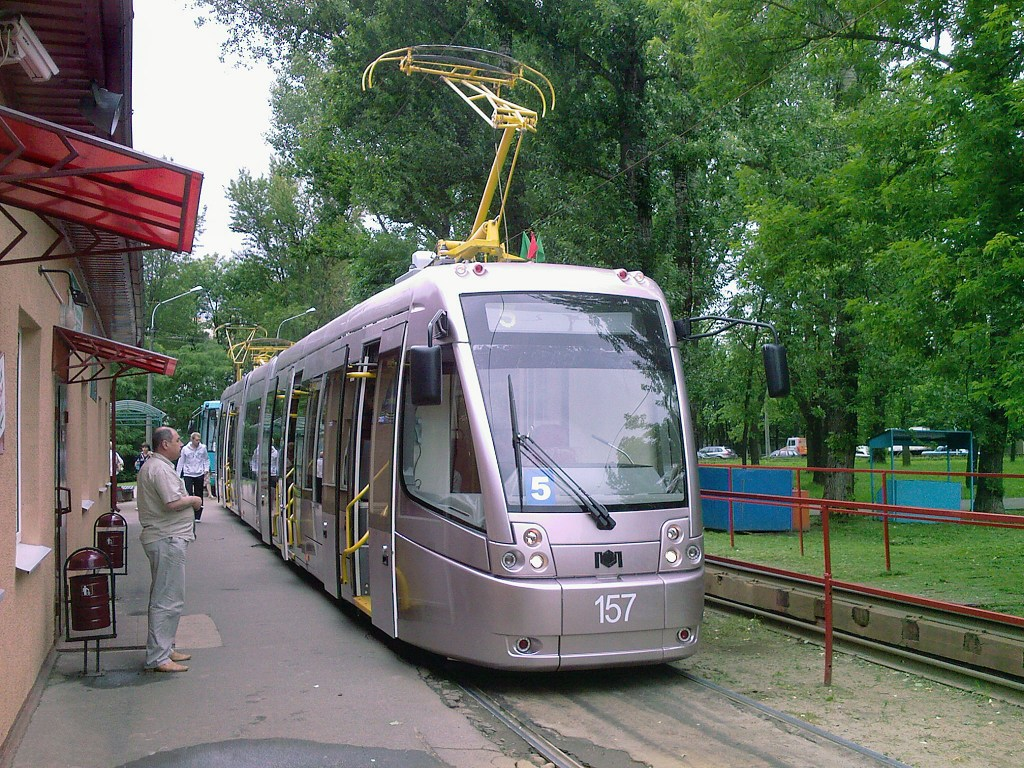
A modern tramway AKSM-843 in Minsk

This article shows a list of town tramway systems in Belarus. It includes all known tram systems in Belarus, past and present; cities with currently operating systems, and those systems themselves, are indicated in bold and blue background colored rows. Those tram systems that operated on other than standard gauge track (where known) are indicated in the 'Notes' column.

== Overview ==
The first electric tramway systems in Belarus started on 13 October 1929 when two Belarusian tramlines were created in Minsk. There are now 11 tramlines in Minsk.

== List of systems ==
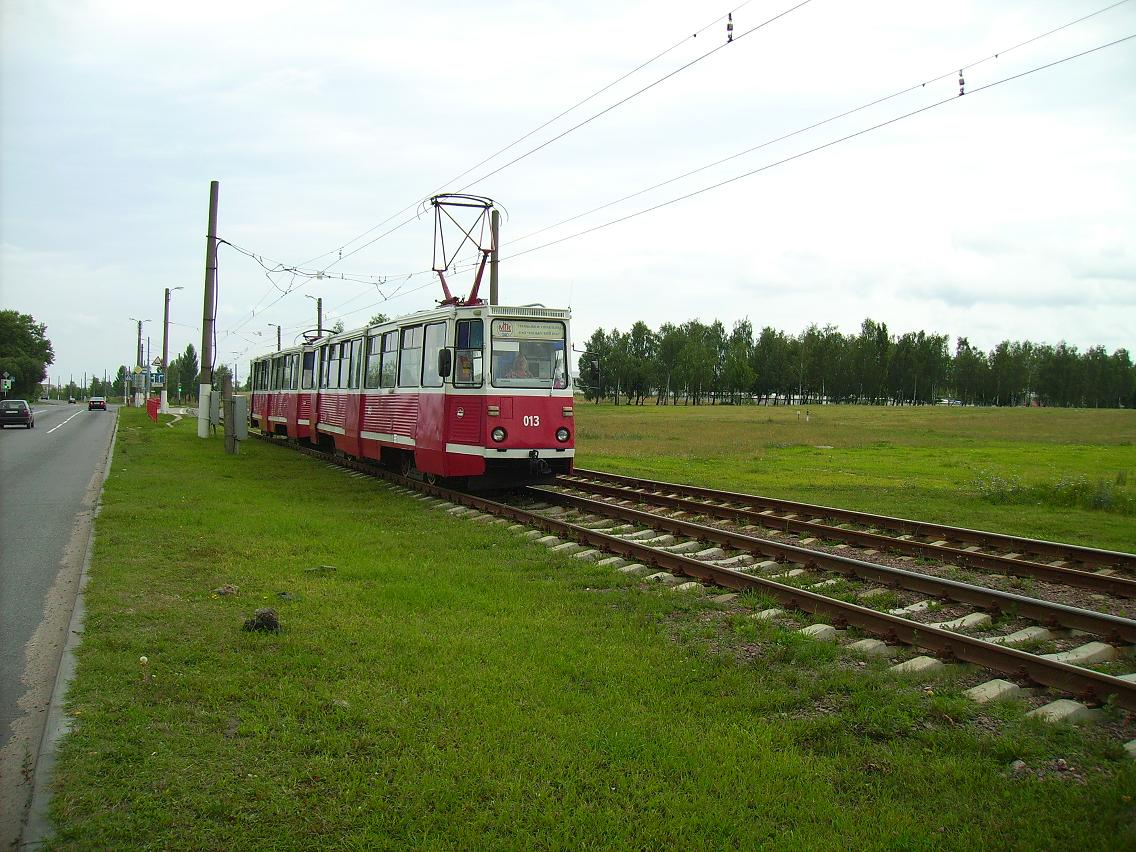
Mazyr

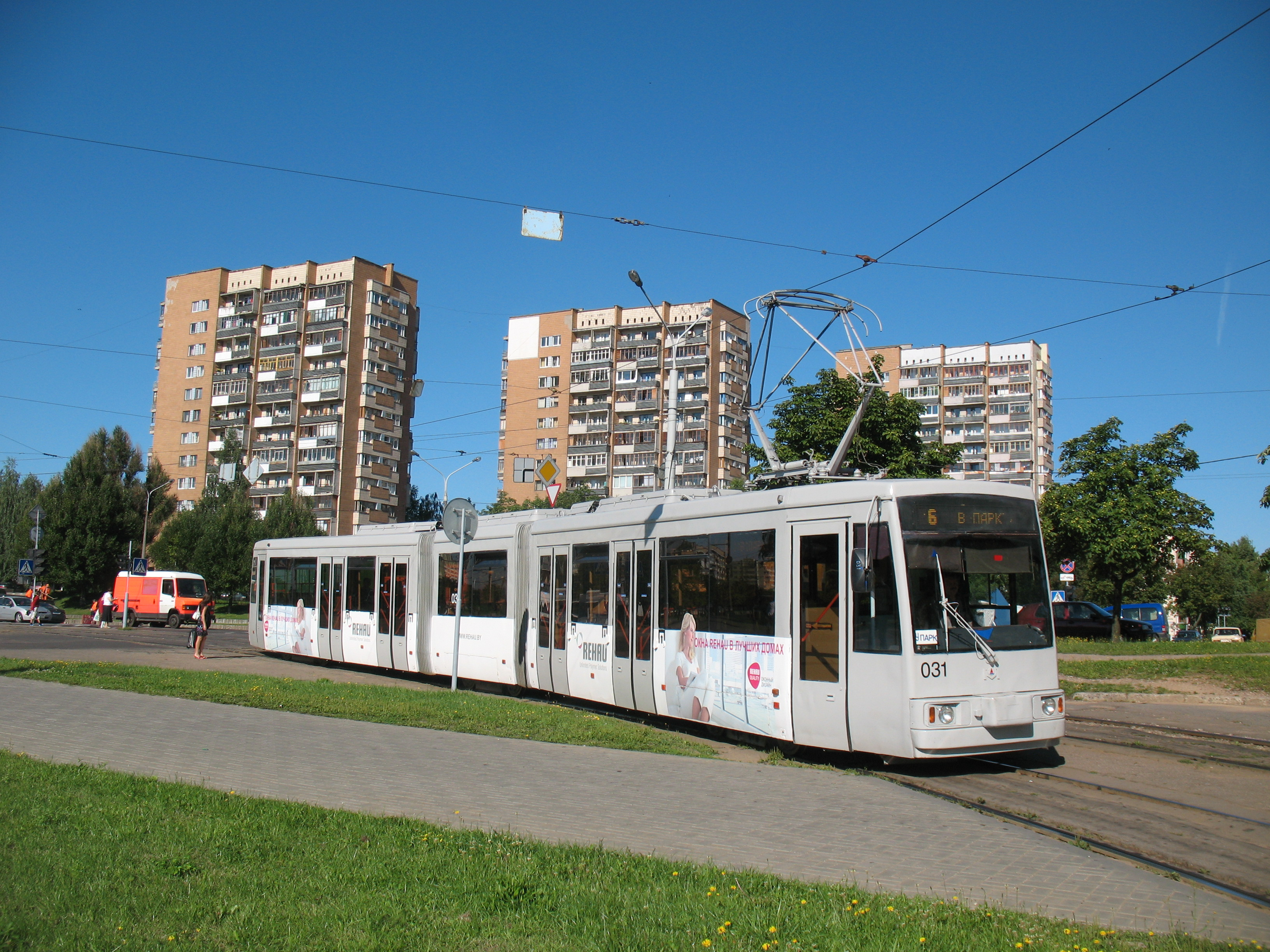
Minsk

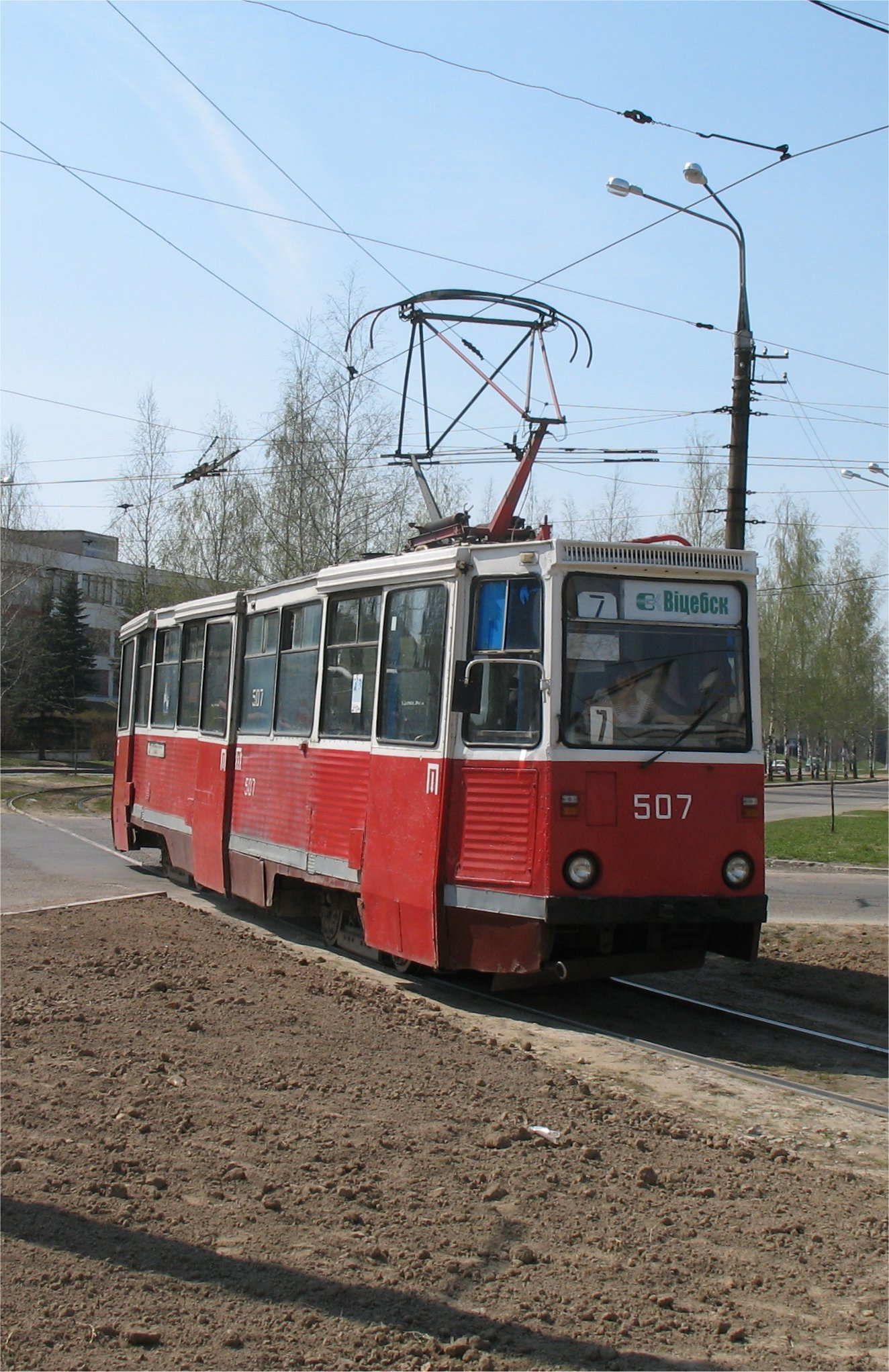
Vitebsk

Location	Name of System	Traction Type	Date (From)	Date (To)	Notes
Mahilyow		Horse	10 Feb 1910	1920	
**Mazyr**	Trams in Mazyr	Electric (express tramway)	01 Aug 1988		Gauge: 1,524 mm (5 ft)
**Minsk**	Trams in Minsk	Horse	22 May 1892	20 Jan 1928	Gauge: 1,000 mm (3 ft 3 3/8 in); Operation suspended May 1918 - 07 August 1921 because of war.
**Minsk**	Trams in Minsk	Electric	13 Oct 1929		Gauge: 1,524 mm (5 ft); Operation suspended 25 June 1941 - 1 May 1943 and June 1944 - 30 April 1945 because of war.
**Novopolotsk**	Trams in Navapolatsk	Electric (express tramway)	21 May 1974		Gauge: 1,524 mm (5 ft)
**Vitebsk**	Trams in Vitebsk	Electric	30 Jun 1896		Gauge: 1,524 mm (5 ft); Operation suspended 1918 - April 1923 and July 1941 - 5 October 1947 because of war.

== Maps of the systems ==
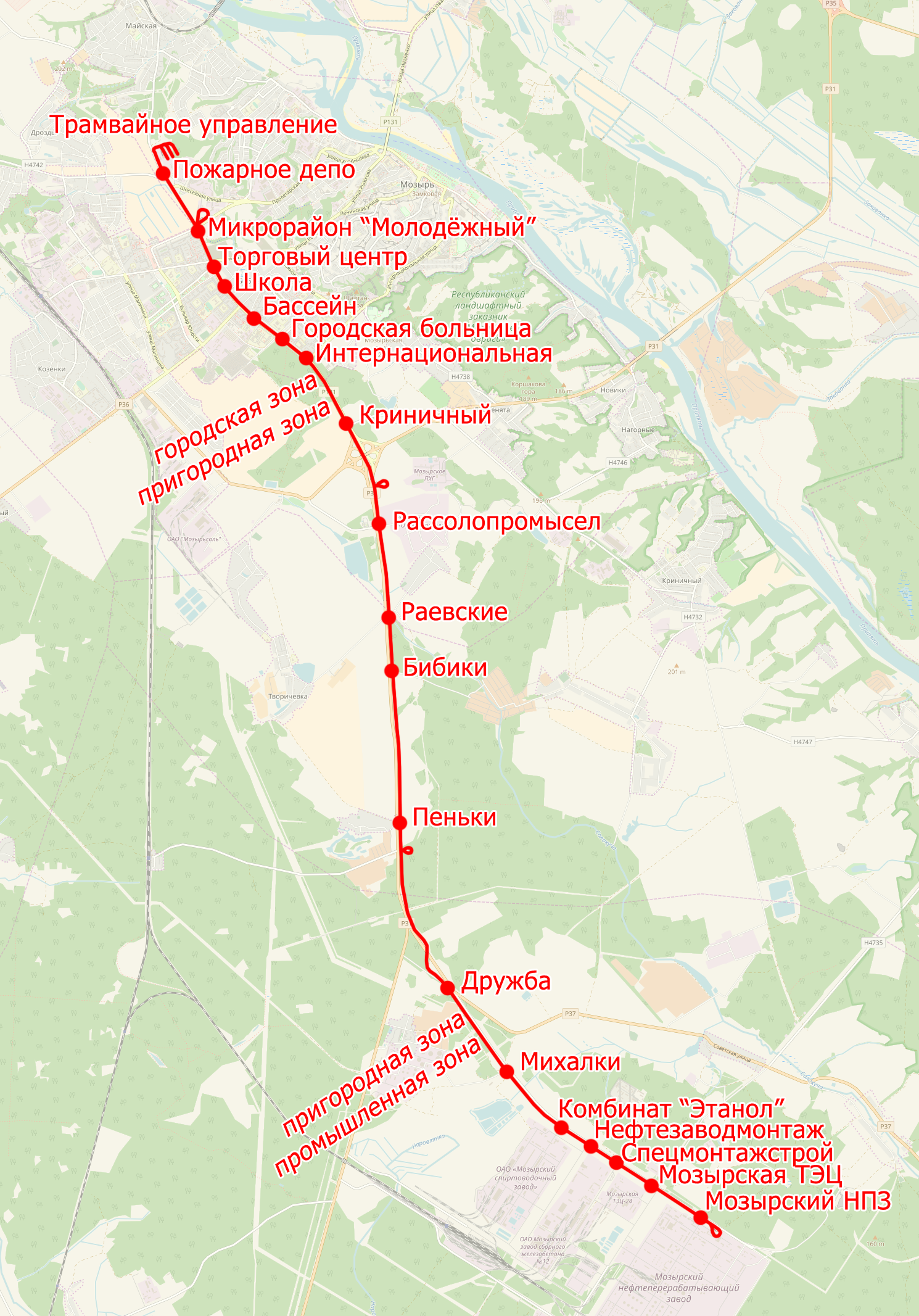
Mazyr (Mozyr')

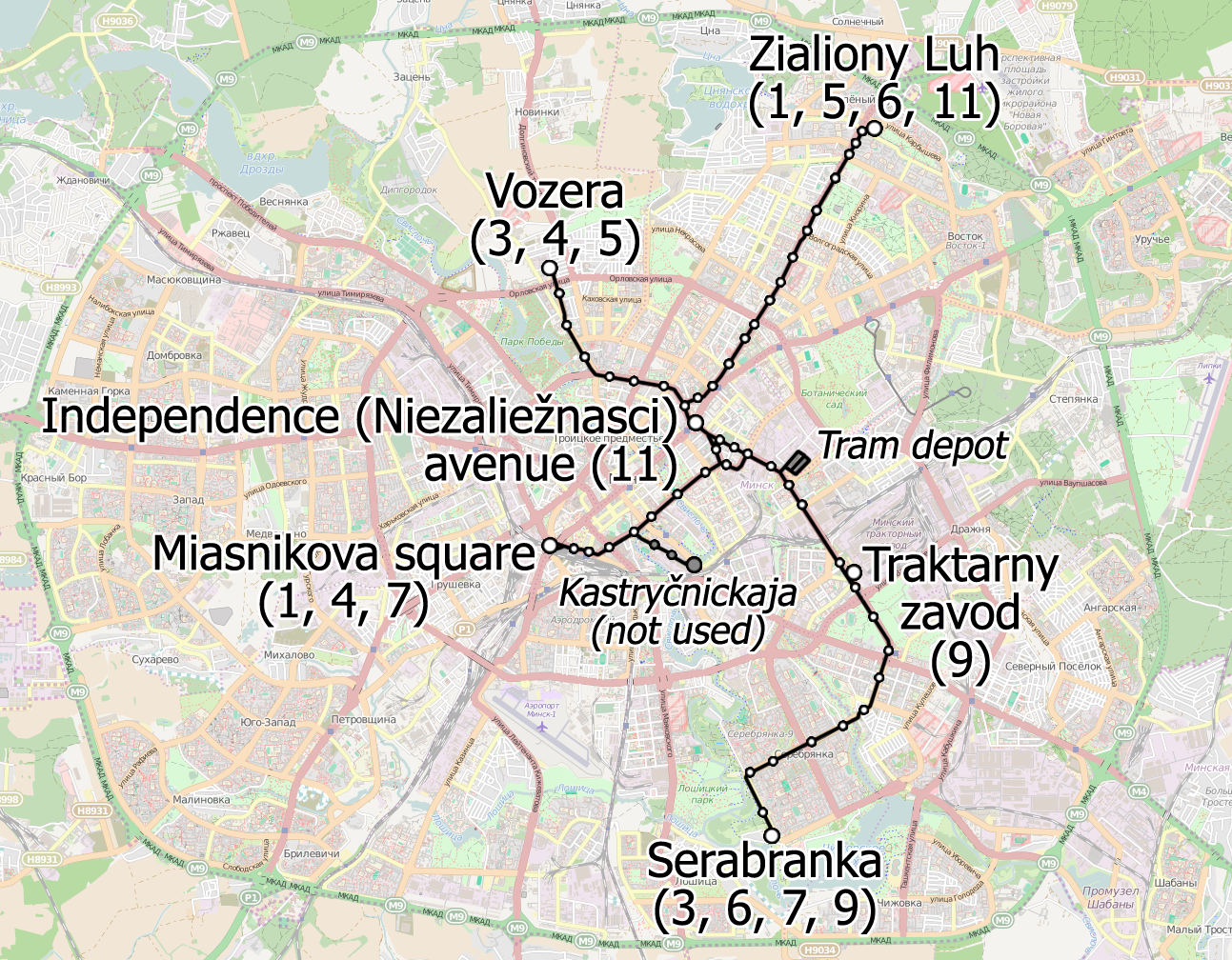
Minsk

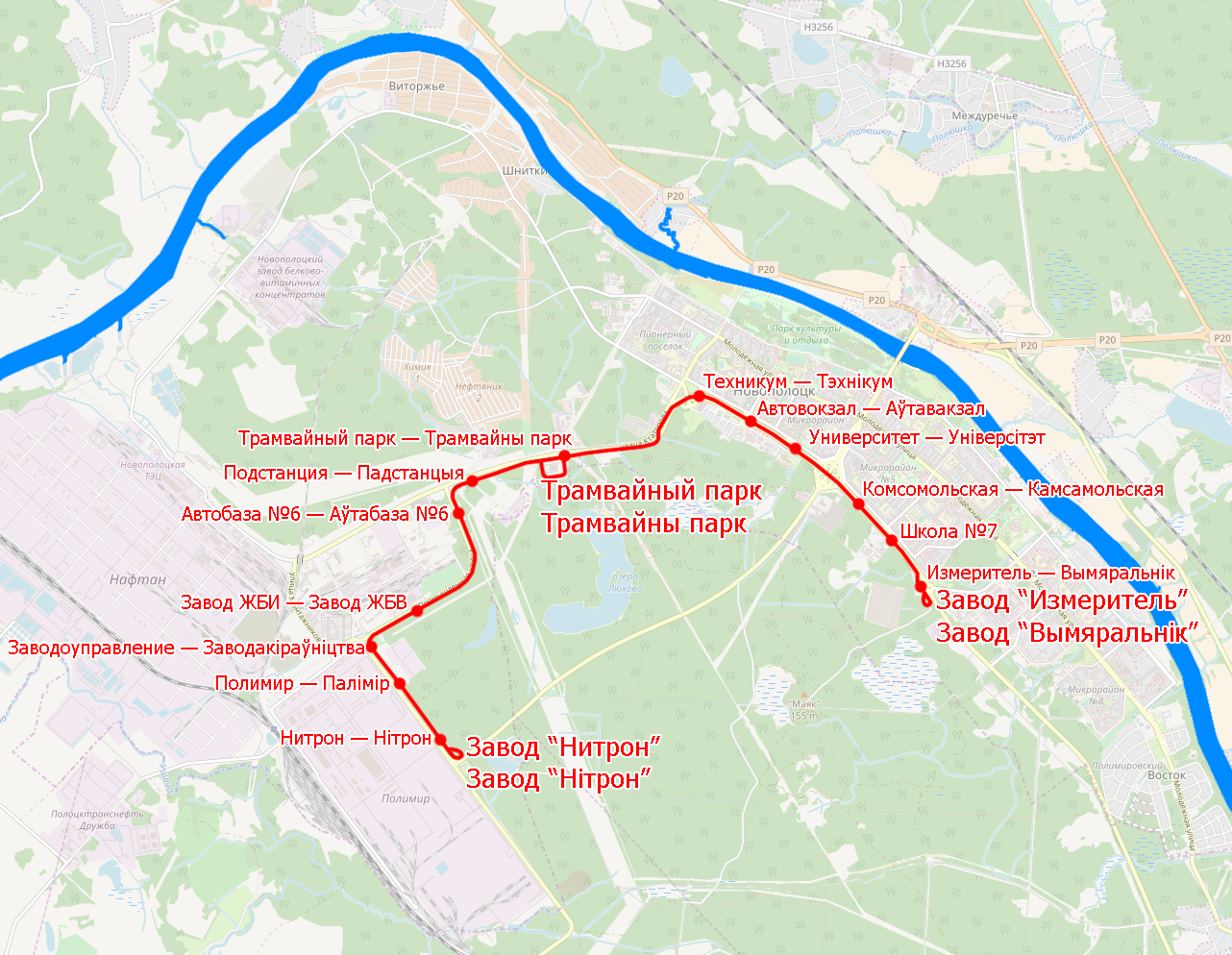
Navapolack (Novopolotsk)

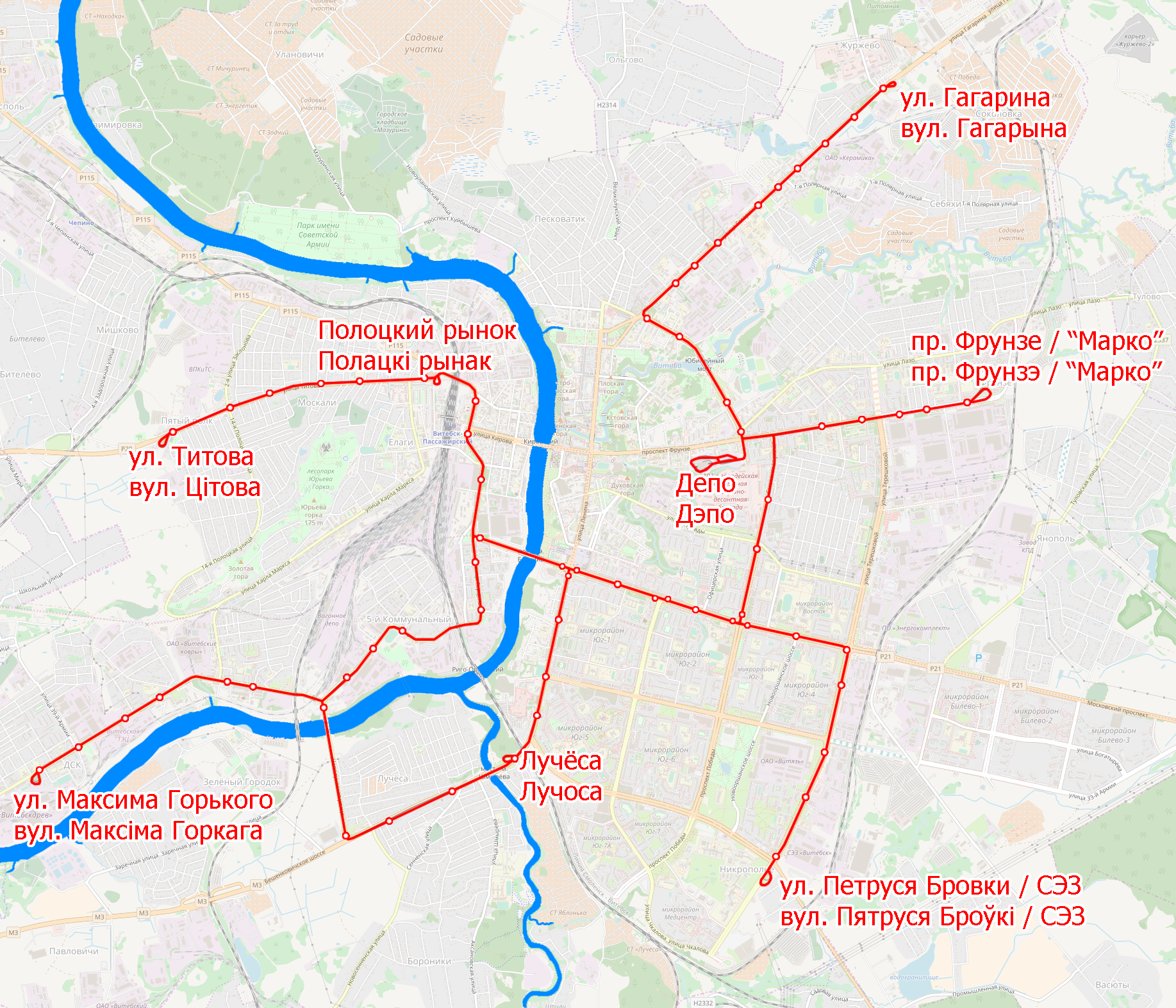
Viciebsk (Vitebsk)

== See also ==
- Rail transport in Belarus
- Transport in Belarus
- List of town tramway systems in Europe
