= Transport in Belarus =

Transportation networks and infrastructure in Belarus

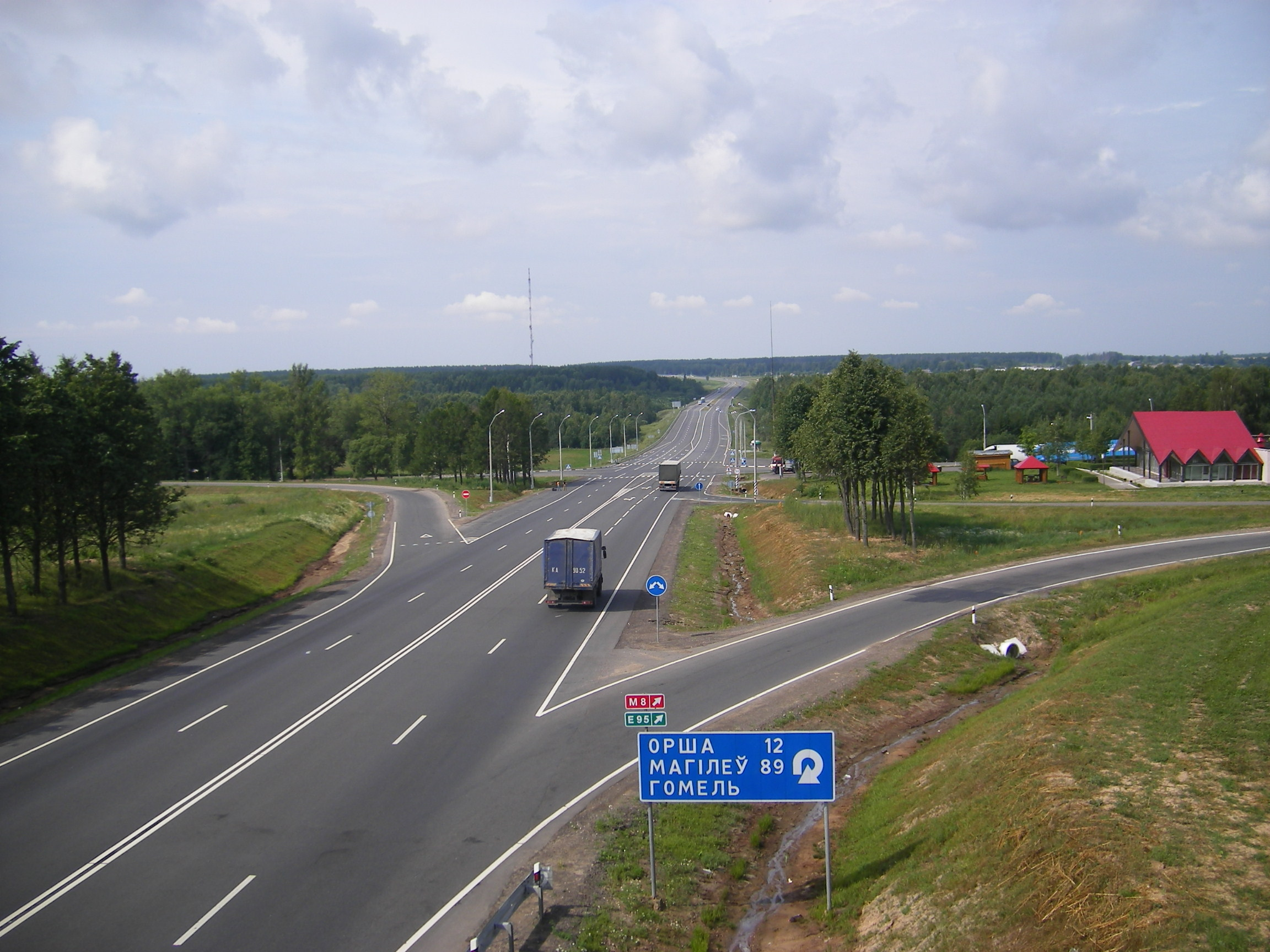
M1 highway at Orsha

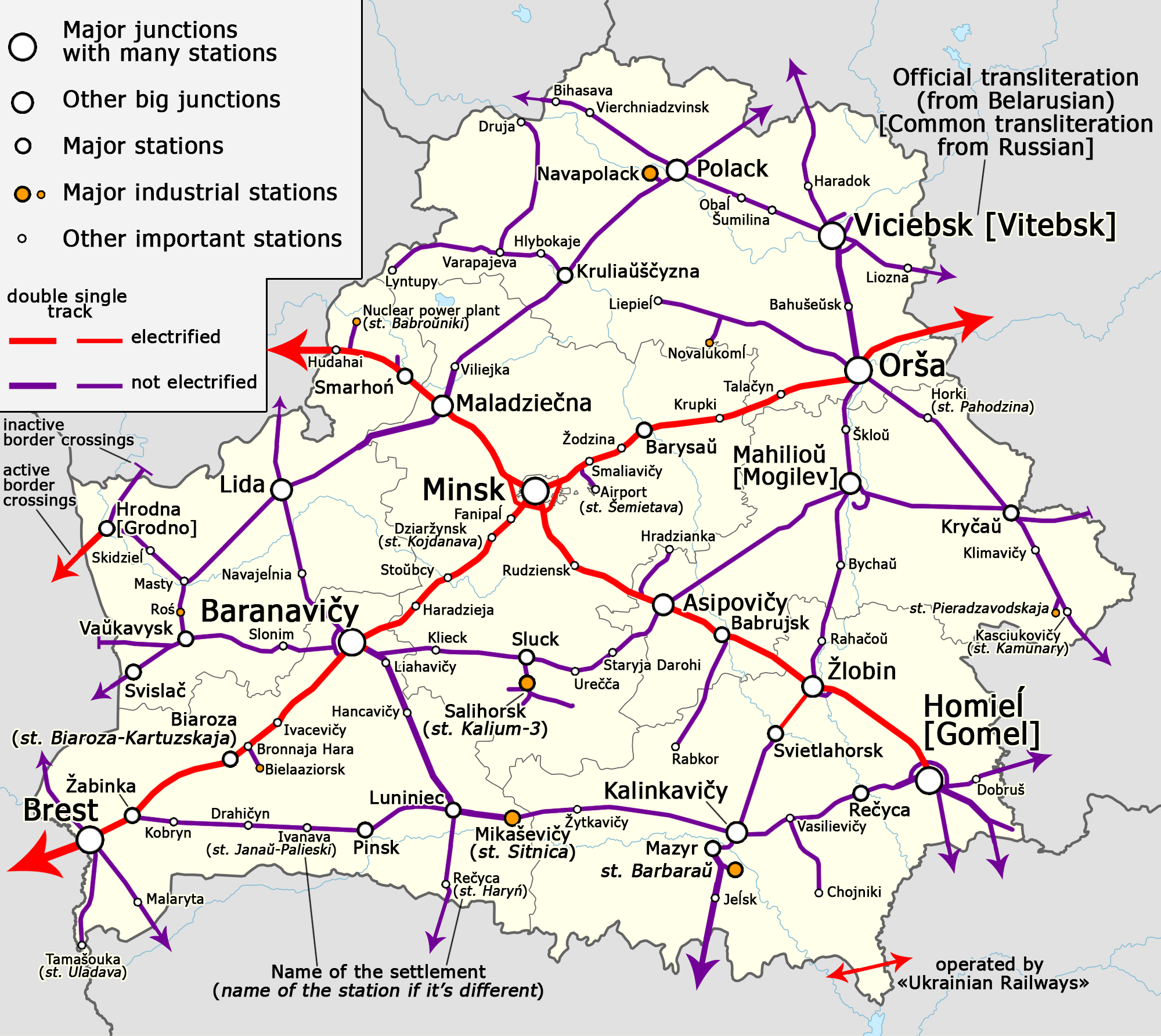
Rail transport map of Belarus

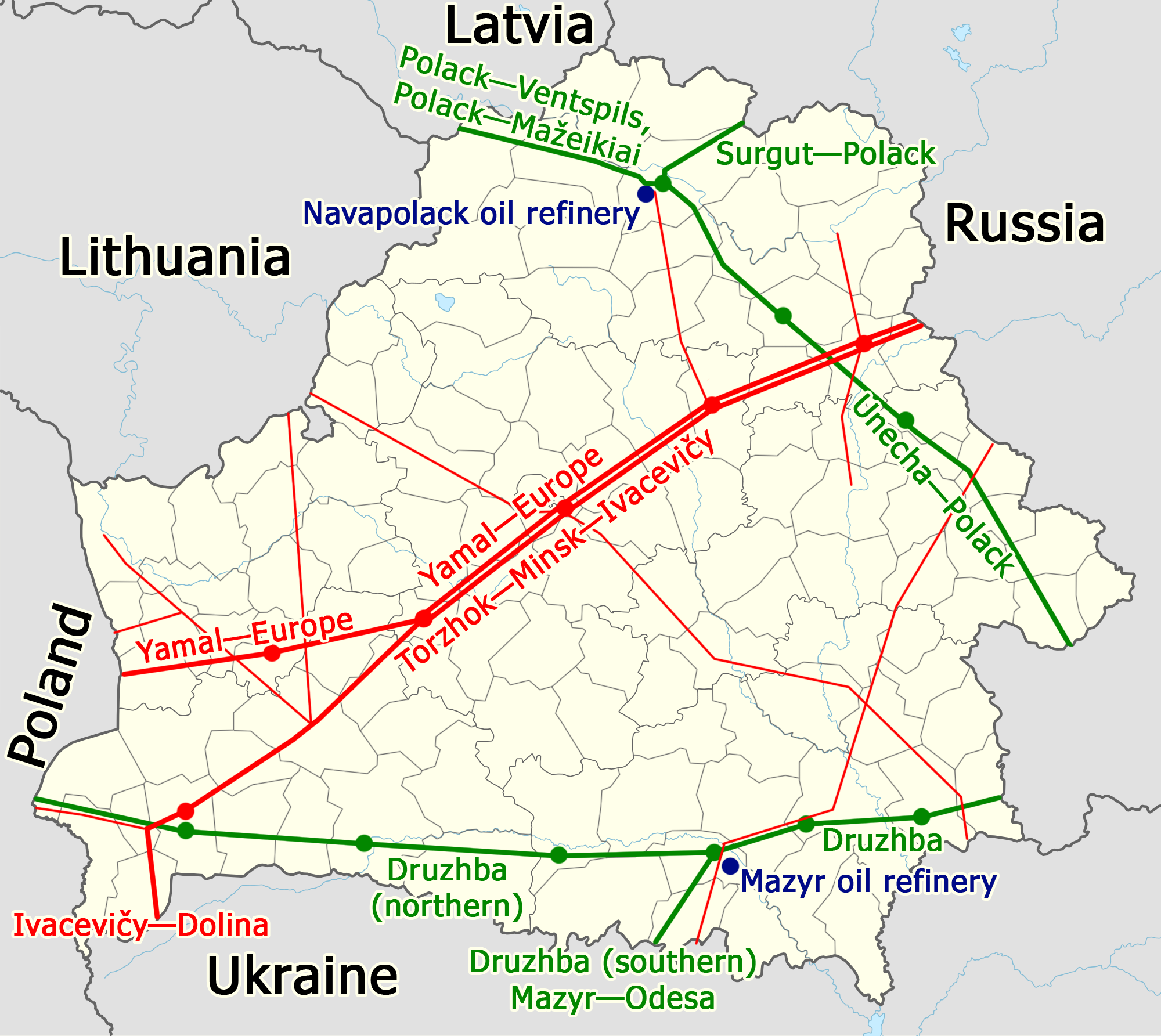
Major gas (red) and oil (green) pipelines in Belarus

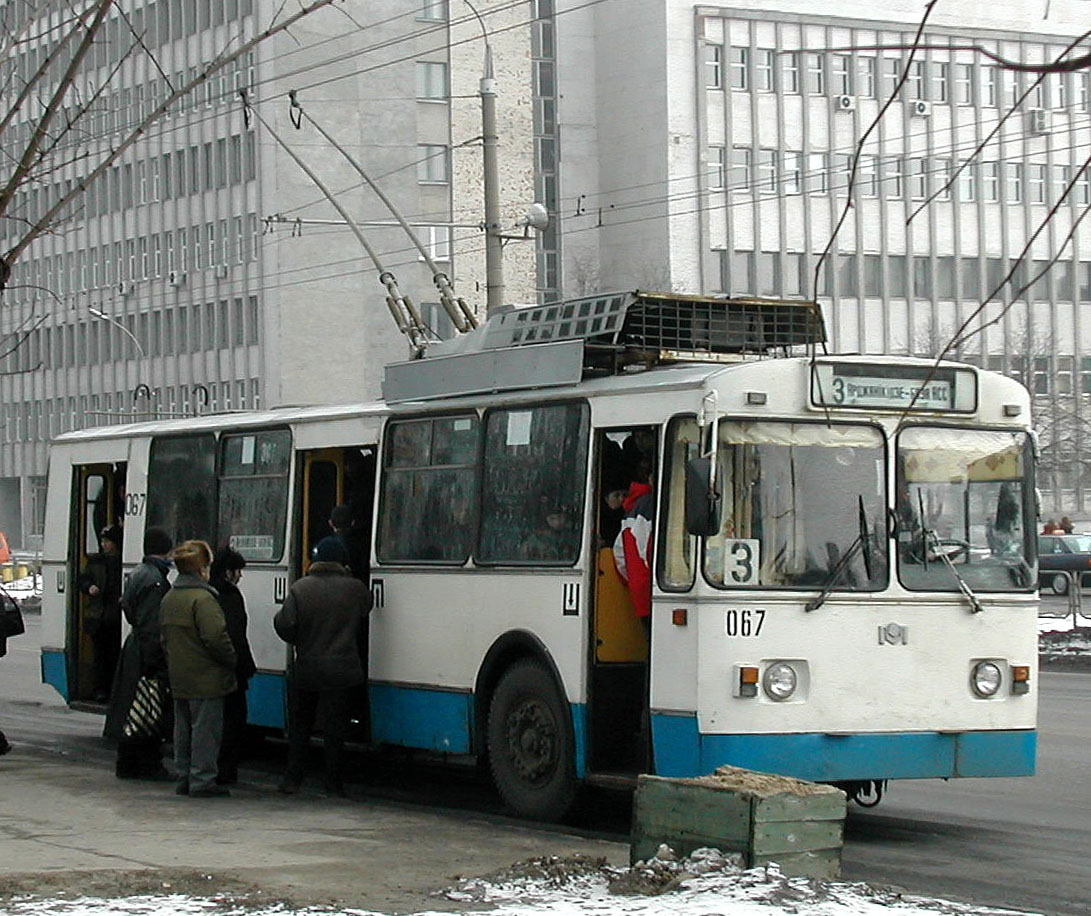
A Trolleybus in Brest

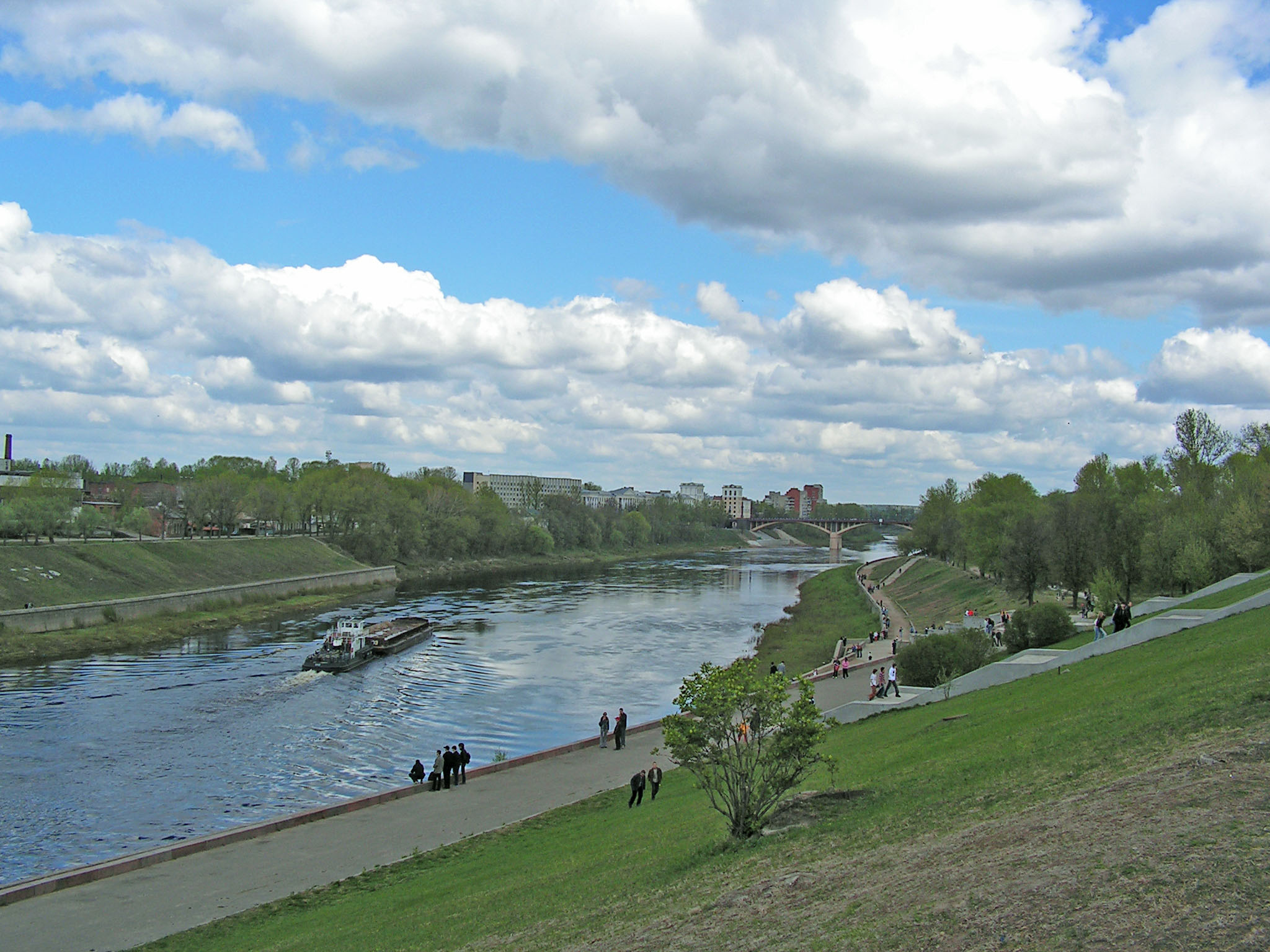
A ferry crossing the Daugava river in Vitebsk

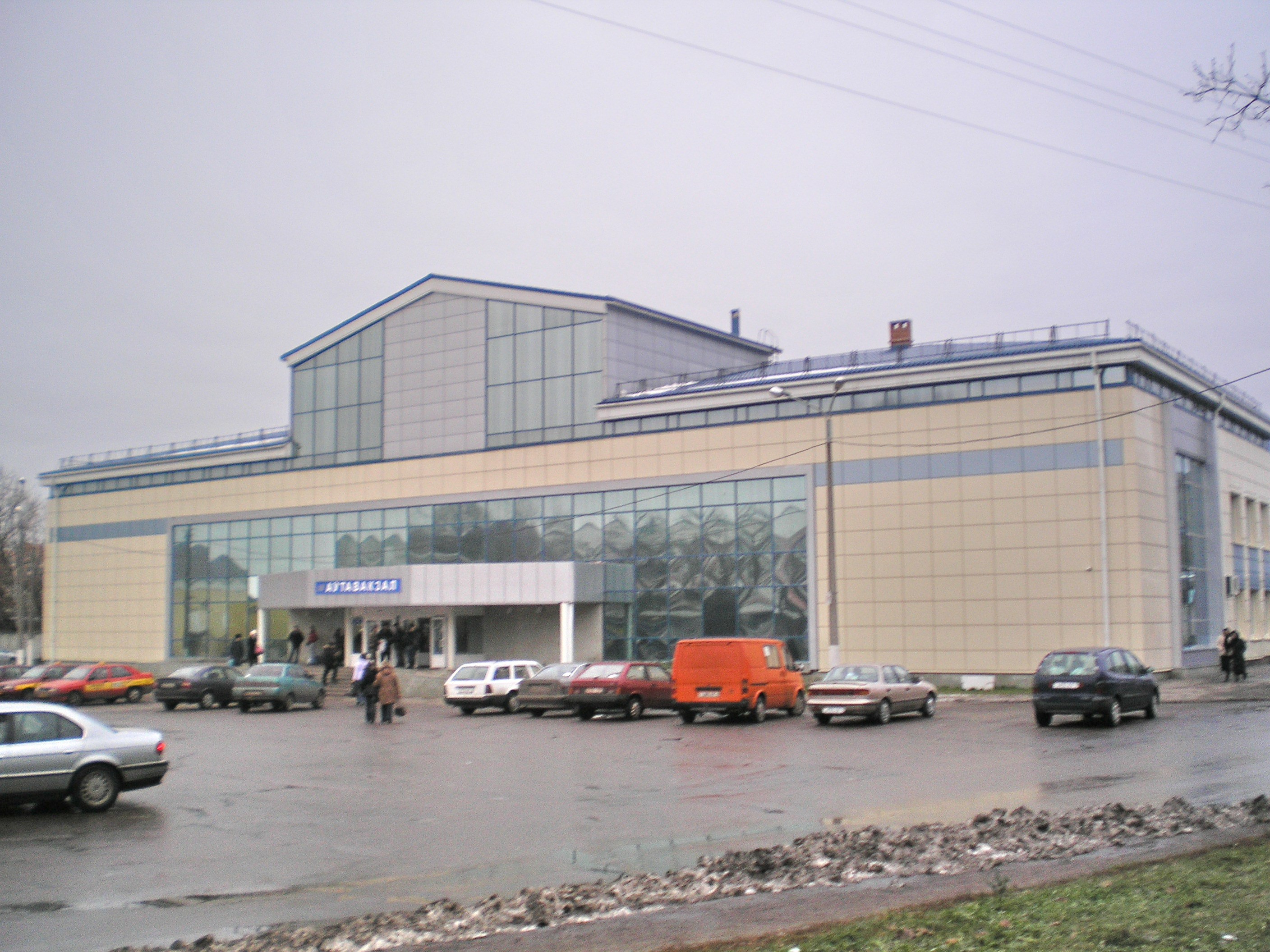
The autobus station of Gomel

Transport in Belarus consists of an extensive network of railways, roads, inland waterways, pipelines, and airports that support domestic travel and international transit. Owing to its central location in Eastern Europe, Belarus serves as an important transport corridor between Russia and the European Union, with rail and road transport playing a particularly significant role.

== Railways ==
Rail transport in Belarus is operated by Belarusskaya Chyhunka
total: 5,512 kilometres (3,425 mi)
country comparison to the world: 32
broad gauge: 5,497 km (3,416 mi) of 1,520 mm (4 ft 11 27/32 in) gauge (874 km (543 mi) electrified) (2006)

- City with underground railway system: Minsk, see Minsk Metro
- For tramway systems: see List of town tramway systems in Belarus

== Highways ==
The owners of highways may be the Republic of Belarus, its political subdivisions, legal and natural persons, who own roads, as well as legal entities, which roads are fixed on the basis of economic or operational management.

Republican state administration in the field of roads and road activity is the Department Belavtodor under the Ministry of Transport and Communications of the Republic of Belarus.

In total, in Belarus there are more than 93,000 km (57,800 mi) of roads and 200 km (120 mi) of departmental thousand (agriculture, industry, forestry, etc.), including 16,000 km (10,000 mi) in cities and towns. The density of paved roads has been relatively low – 337 km per 1,000 km^{2} territory – for comparison, in European countries with well-developed road network, the figure is an average of 906 km (563 mi).

total: 93,055 km (57,822 mi)
paved: 93,055 km (57,822 mi) (2003)

== Waterways ==
2,500 km (1,550 mi) (use limited by location on perimeter of country and by shallowness) (2003)
country comparison to the world: 37

Belarus' inland waterways are managed by Dneprobugvodput, Belvodput, and the Dnieper-Berezinsky Enterprise.

== Pipelines ==
gas 5,250 km (3,260 mi); oil 1,528 km (949 mi); refined products 1,730 km (1,070 mi) (2008)

== Ports and harbors ==
- Mazyr - on the river Pripyat

== Airports ==
65 (2008):
country comparison to the world: 76

- Minsk International Airport
- Minsk-1
- Gomel Airport

=== Airports - with paved runways ===
total: 35
over 3,047 m (10,000 ft): 2
2,438 to 3,047 m (8,000 to 10,000 ft): 22
1,524 to 2,437 m (5,000 to 8,000 ft): 4
914 to 1,524 m (3,000 to 5,000 ft): 1
under 914 m (3,000 ft): 6 (2008)

=== Airports - with unpaved runways ===
total: 30
2,438 to 3,047 m (8,000 to 10,000 ft): 1
1,524 to 2,437 m (5,000 to 8,000 ft): 1
914 to 1,523 m (3,000 to 5,000 ft): 2
under 914 m (3,000 ft): 26 (2008)

=== Heliports ===
1 (2007)Heliports is where helicopter land.

=== National air-carrier ===
- Belavia

== See also ==
- Transport in the Soviet Union
- Vehicle registration plates of Belarus
