= Rail transport in Belarus =

Rail network in Belarus
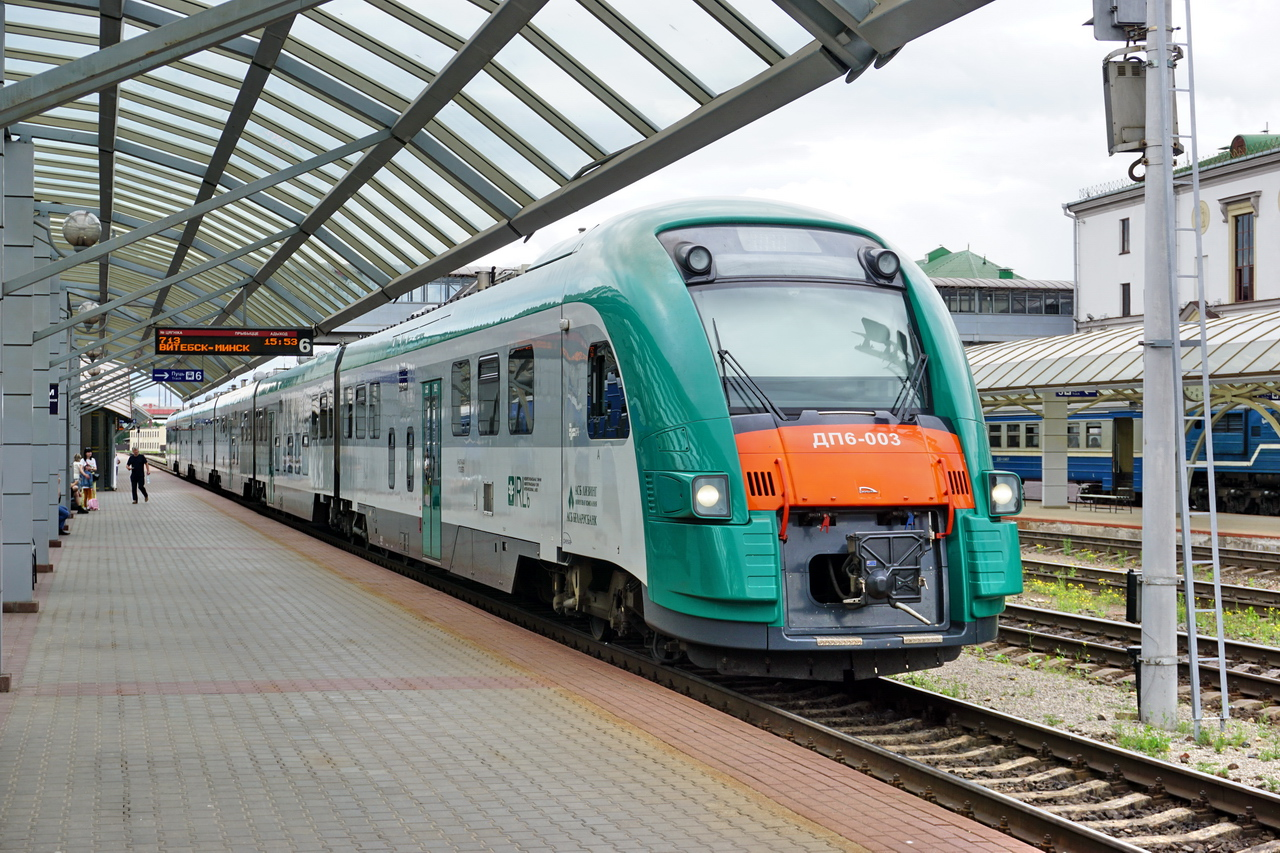

Operation
- National railway: Belarusskaja Železnaja Doroga

System length
- Total: 5,512 km (3,425 mi)
- Electrified: 874 km (543 mi)
- Freight only: ?
- High-speed: 0 km

Track gauge
- Main: 1,520 mm (4 ft 11 27/32 in)

Electrification
- 25 kV 50 Hz: Main network

Features
Map
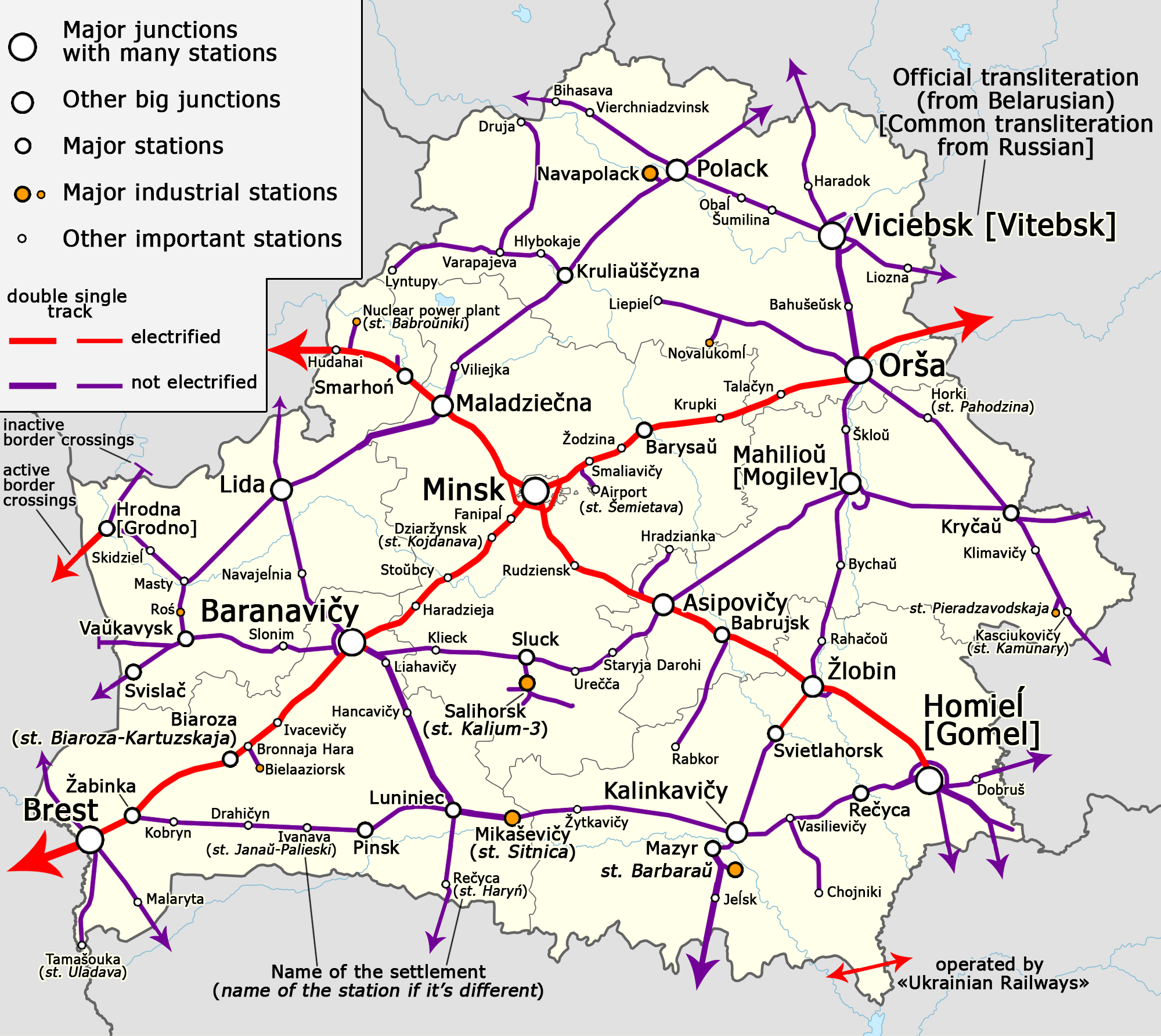

Rail transport in Belarus is owned by the national rail company BŽD / BČ (Belarusian: Bielaruskaja Čyhunka / Russian: Belorusskaja Železnaja Doroga). The railway network of Belarus consists of 5,512 km (3,425 mi) of lines, its gauge is 1,520 mm (4 ft 11 27/32 in) Russian gauge (broad gauge), of which 874 km (543 mi) are electrified.

== History ==
The first line crossing the country was the Saint Petersburg–Warsaw Railway, which started operating in late 1862. This included section and railway station in Hrodna. During the mid-1860s, railway line was built also from Daugavpils to Polatsk and further to Vitebsk. Line Warsaw-Brest, opened in 1866, completed to Moscow in 1871.

== Network ==
Belarus is crossed, from Brest to Orsha through Minsk, by an international rail line connecting Berlin and Warsaw to Moscow. Other important lines are the Minsk-Gomel (to Kyiv), the Orsha-Vitebsk (to Saint Petersburg), the Minsk-Vilnius and others. Some international trains serving Belarus are the Pribaltika Riga-Odesa, the Minsk-Irkutsk and the Sibirjak Berlin-Novosibirsk (and other Russian destinations).

The national network has no high-speed lines and is not served by high-speed trains.

== Urban railways ==
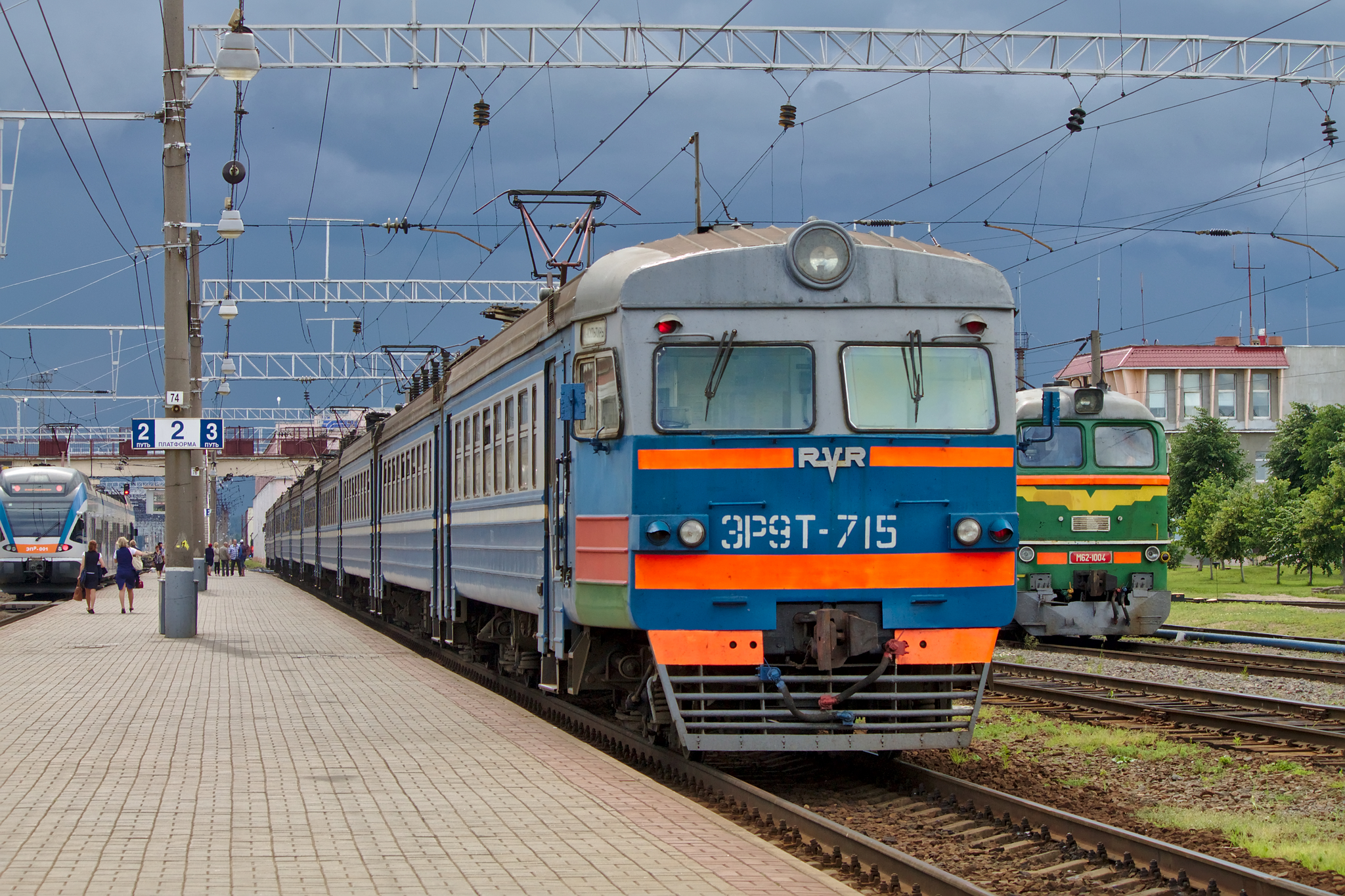
Electric trainsets in Orsha

Minsk is the only city with a subway system, the Minsk Metro. The network consists of three lines: Awtazavodskaya, Maskoŭskaja and Zelenaluzhskaya. The only cities with tramway systems are Minsk, Vitebsk, Mazyr and Novopolotsk.

== Rail links to adjacent countries ==
- (Poland) – yes – break-of-gauge 1,520 mm (4 ft 11 27/32 in)/1,435 mm (4 ft 8 1/2 in)
- (Lithuania) – yes (closed)
- (Latvia) – yes (closed)
- (Russia) – yes
- (Ukraine) – yes (closed)

== See also ==
- Transport in Belarus
- List of town tramway systems in Belarus
- Children's Railroad of Minsk
- Rail transport in the Soviet Union
