= Ryczywół, Masovian Voivodeship =

Ryczywół
- Village
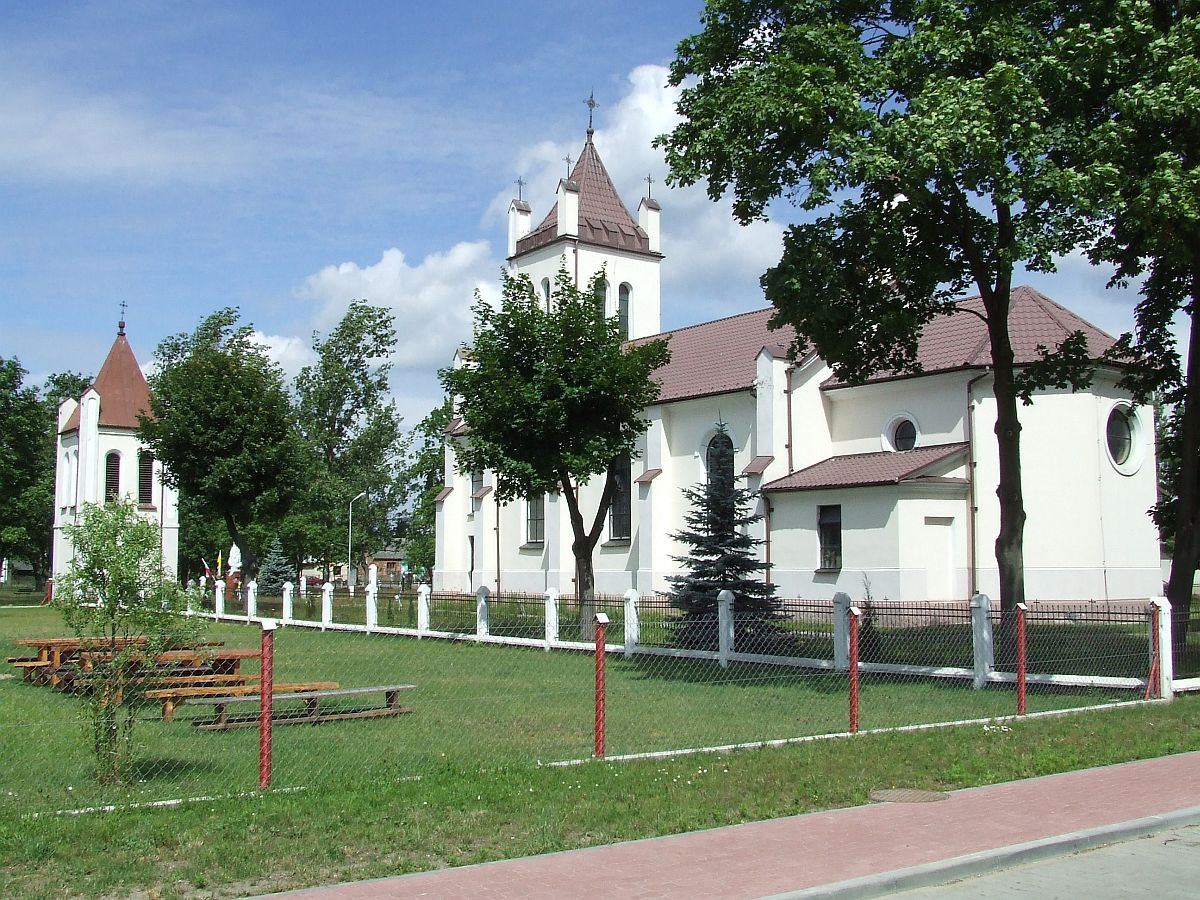
- Catholic church in Ryczywół

- Location within Poland
- Coordinates: 51°41′24″N 21°25′17″E
- Country: Poland
- Voivodeship: Masovian
- County: Kozienice
- Gmina: Kozienice

Population
  - Total: 1,300
- Time zone: UTC+1 (CET)
  - Summer (DST): UTC+2 (CEST)
- Vehicle registration: WKZ

Ryczywół is a village (a town in 1409–1869) in Masovian Voivodeship, Poland, located in the northern edge of the historic region of Lesser Poland. The village is located along National Road Nr. 79, which goes from Warsaw to Bytom. Ryczywół lies near the confluence of the Radomka and Vistula rivers at the border of Puszcza Stromecka wilderness.

== Etymology ==
The name of the village probably comes from two Polish words - ryczy (bellow) and wół (ox), and comes from herds of cattle, which used to be moved through Ryczywół on the way from Red Ruthenia towards the west.

== History ==
Jan Długosz wrote that in the 13th century Ryczywół already had St. Catherine parish church. In the 14th century, the village belonged to Polish kings, and a royal court was located here. In 1407 it was the seat of a starosta, located in Sandomierz Voivodeship, and two years later Ryczywół was granted town rights by King Władysław Jagiełło. The town, which in the 15th and 16th centuries belonged to several private owners, was famous in the region for a bridge on the Radomka river. Merchants had to pay a toll to cross it. In 1655 during the Swedish invasion of Poland, Ryczywół was destroyed by the Swedes and never regained its importance. The 1st Polish National Cavalry Brigade was stationed in the town. In the 18th centuries, Jews started to settle there, and in 1813 whole town was moved some 2.5 kilometers from its original location. This was due to frequent floods of the Radomka and the Vistula. In 1869 the government of the Russian-controlled Congress Poland stripped Ryczywół of its town charter.

On 15 September 1939, a battle between the Wehrmacht and Polish units of Łódź Army took place here. At the beginning of World War II, most of the village was burned down by the invading German army, forcing the inhabitants to scatter throughout neighboring villages. In June 1940 there was an outbreak of typhus. The Jewish community of Ryczywół consisted of 160 people. In early 1942 a small ghetto was set up there within the ghettoization process of the entire Radom-Land ordered by Kreishauptmann Friedrich Egen. In August of that year, 160 Jews were sent to Kozienice ghetto and in September, to Treblinka extermination camp, while 69 Jews went to Sobibor on 4 August 1942. Ryczywół was completely destroyed in 1944, during Soviet-German fighting at Warka-Magnuszew bridgehead (see Vistula–Oder Offensive).

In 1968–1979, the Kozienice Power Station was built nearby.
