= Dnieper–Bug Canal =

Inland ship canal in Belarus

Coordinates: 52°03′26″N 25°39′06″E

Dnieper–Bug Canal Belarusian: Дняпроўска-Бугскі канал
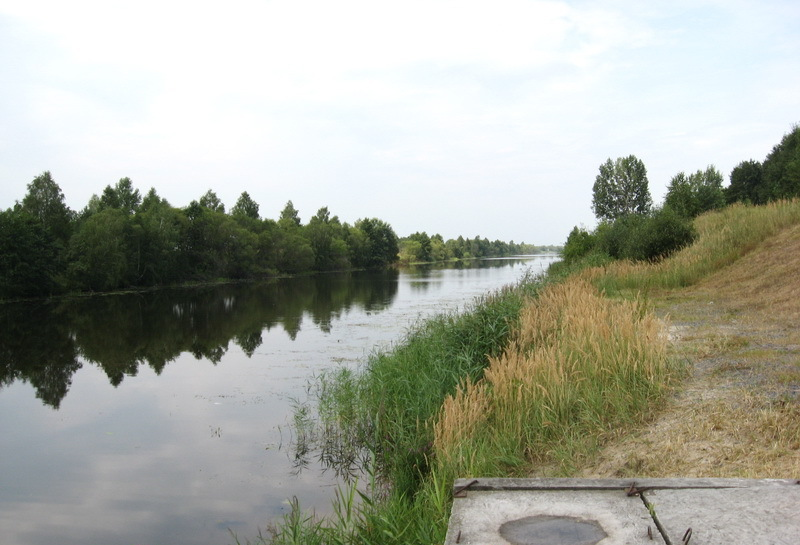
- Interactive map of Dnieper–Bug Canal; Belarusian: Дняпроўска-Бугскі канал

Specifications
- Length: 105 km (65 miles)
- Locks: 20
- Status: Open

History
- Construction began: 1775
- Date completed: 1784

Geography
- Start point: Bug River near Brest, Belarus
- End point: Pripyat River near Sapotskin, Belarus

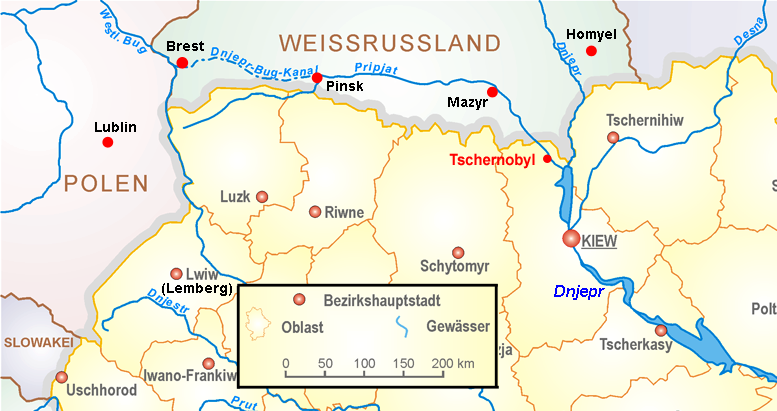
Dnieper-Bug Canal

The Dnieper–Bug Canal (alternatively the Dnepr-Bug Canal), or the Dneprovsko-Bugsky Canal, is the longest inland ship canal in Belarus. It connects the Mukhavets River (a tributary of the Bug River) and the Pina River (a tributary of the Pripyat River). It is managed by Dneprobugvodput.

The artificial channel dug between Kobryn and Pinsk was originally named the Royal Canal (Polish: Kanał Królewski), after the King of Poland Stanisław August Poniatowski (r. 1764–1795), who initiated its construction. It forms an important part of the transportation artery linking the Baltic Sea and the Black Sea. The total length of the canal system from Brest to Pinsk is 196 km (122 mi), including the 105 km (65 mi) long artificial waterway.

The drainage area of the canal system totals 8,500 km^{2} (3,300 sq mi).

== History ==
=== Origins ===
Canal building flourished in the Polish–Lithuanian Commonwealth in the late 18th century. Yet many of the early canals are no longer in active service, having been superseded by railroads and highways. The Dnieper–Bug Canal after several enlargements still provides a convenient inland waterway. Until the 18th century there was a portage between Kobrin and Pinsk as it was a part of the important long-distance trade route from the Black Sea to the Baltic Sea. The names of the Voloka River and the village of Mukhovloki near Kobrin reflect the existence of the ancient portage. People have settled along the portage route since ancient times due to the importance of the (Trade route from the Varangians to the Greeks).

=== Proposal and design ===
In the mid-17th century, Jerzy Ossoliński, Crown Court Treasurer of the Polish–Lithuanian Commonwealth was the first to suggest the idea of upgrading the portage to a canal with locks. The work started 120 years later. In 1770, the canal was planned by the prominent cartographer Franciszek Florian Czaki.

=== Construction and operation ===
The canal was built in 1775-1784 during the reign of Stanisław August Poniatowski, the last king of the Polish–Lithuanian Commonwealth. Originally it was named Kanał Królewski (English: Royal Canal), after the Polish king, since he was the initiator of the project. Additional work was carried out starting in 1837 by the Russian Empire and completed around 1846–1848. To supply the canal system with water, mainly the canal pound, Beloozerski and Orekhovski watercourses were started in 1839 and completed in 1843. The number of movable weirs between Brest and Pinsk reached 22. As a result, the canal became navigable for bigger vessels, in particular steamers, at any time from spring till autumn. In 1847, the Kanał Królewski was renamed the Dneprovo-Bugski Canal.

=== Decline and abandonment ===
After the construction of the railway along the canal in the late 19th century the canal was used mostly for rafting lumber, exported to western countries. During World War I, the canal was not in use.

=== Reconstruction ===
During the 1920s, it was partly rebuilt anew for the Riverine Flotilla of the Polish Navy (Polish: Flotylla Rzeczna Marynarki Wojennej), better known as the Pinsk Flotilla. The Flotilla was the inland branch of the Polish Navy operating in the area of the Pinsk Marshes between the Polish-Bolshevik War and World War II. During the 1920s, two locks were built.

In 1940, the Soviet authorities initiated a large-scale reconstruction of the canal. A 23 km (14 mi) long stretch of the canal was straightened near Kobrin. Eight locks were built replacing movable weirs.

Navigation on the Dnieper–Bug Canal is interrupted by two weirs near the mouth of the Mukhavets at Brest which are used to raise the level of the river for the city's port. The waterways from the German-Polish border (Oder River, through the Warta, Brda and Noteć rivers, Bydgoszcz Canal, Vistula River, Narew River, Bug River) once used to link the Belarus and Ukrainian inland waterways via Mukhavets River, Dnieper–Bug Canal, Pripyat River and Dnieper River), thus connecting north-western Europe with the Black Sea.

=== Decline and renewal ===
More recently efforts have been undertaken to restore the canal to a class IV inland waterway of international importance. In 2003 the Government of the Republic of Belarus adopted an inland water transport and sea transport development program to rebuild the Dnieper–Bug Canal shipping locks to meet the standards of a class Va European waterway. According to the Belarus government, four sluice dams and one shipping lock have been rebuilt which allow for the passage of vessels 110 meters (360 feet) long, 12 meters (39 feet) wide with a draught of 2.2 meters (7.2 feet). It is expected that reconstruction will continue over the next few years.
