= Mleczna (river) =

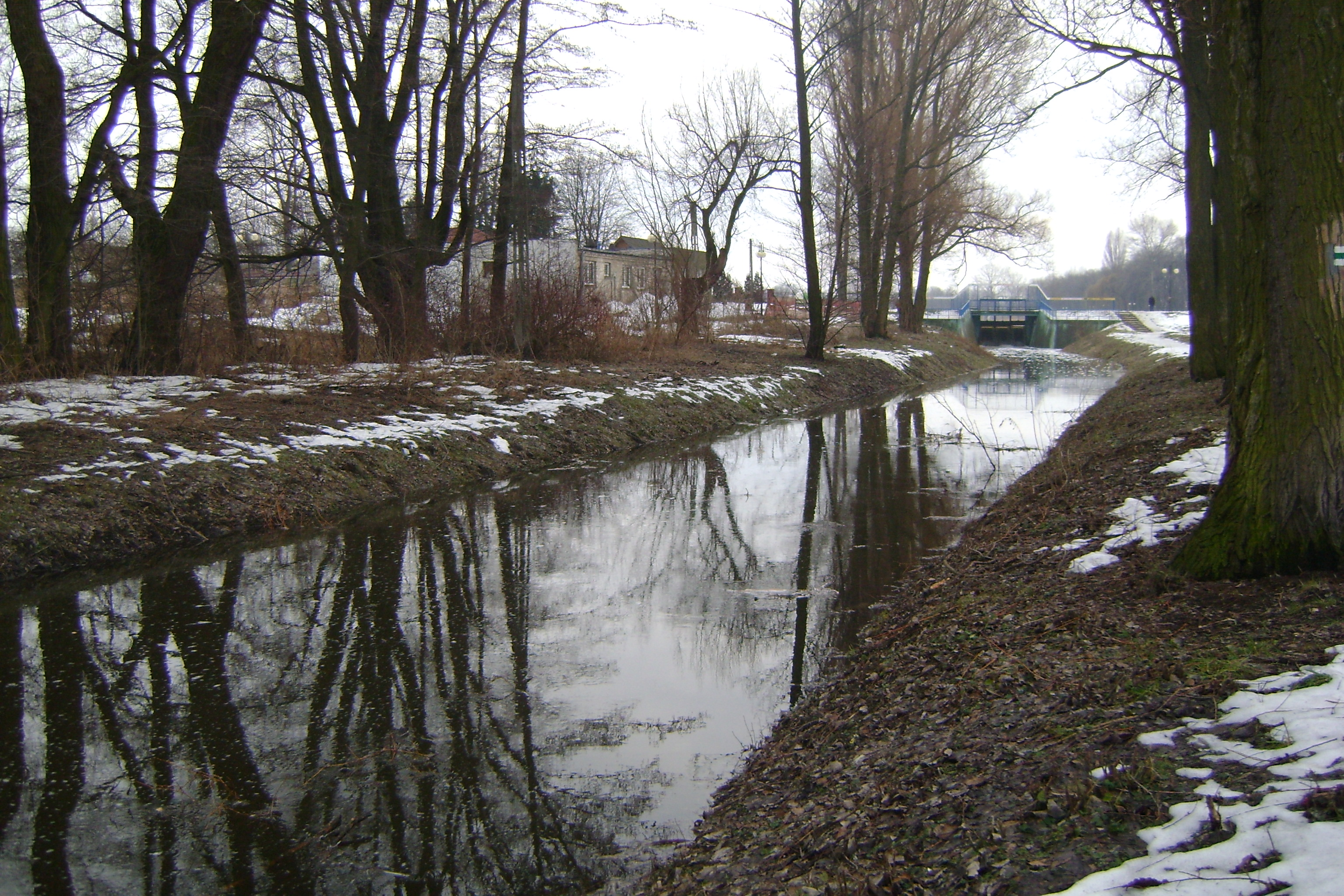

Location
- Country: Poland

Physical characteristics
- Mouth
  - location: Radomka
  - coordinates: 51.51°N 21.1822°E

Basin features
- Progression: Radomka→ Vistula→ Baltic Sea

Mleczna is a river in central Poland, and it is a right tributary of the Radomka river. It has a length of 28.7 km and a basin area of ca. 348.5 km^{2} (all in Poland). The Mleczna has its source at a hill near Kowala and it empties into the Radomka near Lisów. In the latter half of the 8th century an early mediaeval town was built in the valley of the Mleczna River, in the heart of present-day Radom.

Main tributaries:

- Pacynka
- Kosówka
- Potok Malczewski
- Potok Południowy
- Potok Północny

Additional:

- Strumień Godowski
