= Strumień Godowski =

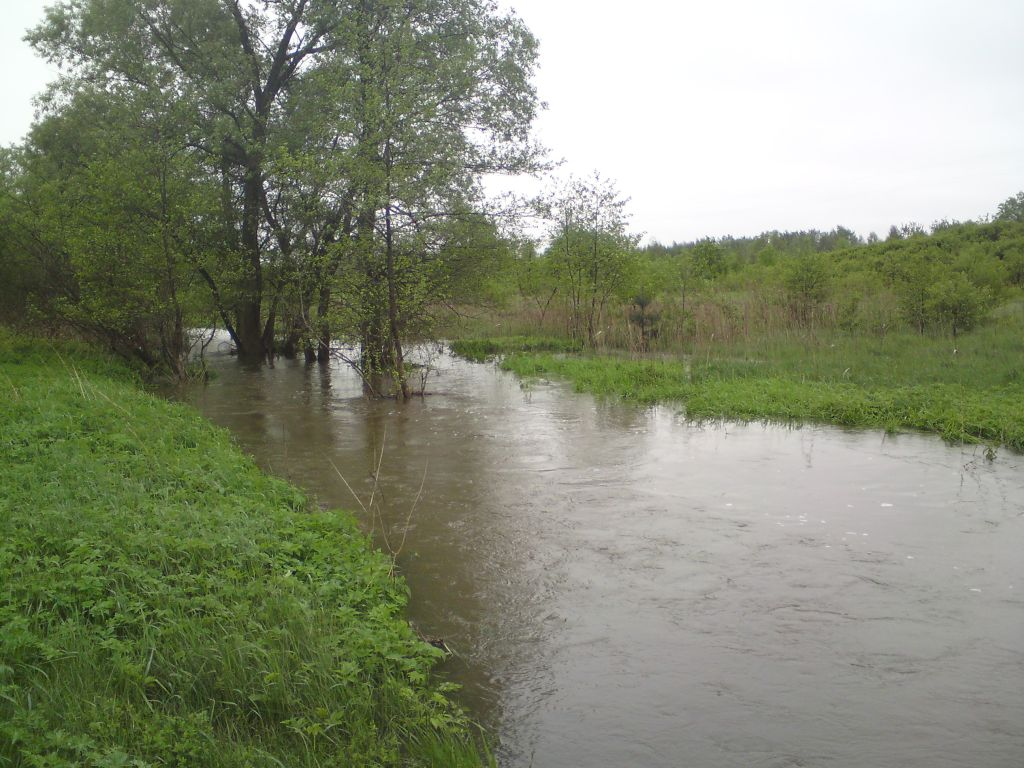
- Strumień Godowski during a heavy rain, near Wiejska Street, in Radom

Location
- Country: Poland
- Voivodeship: Masovian

Physical characteristics
- Source
  - location: east of Mazowszany, Radom County
  - coordinates: 51°20′10″N 21°09′01″E
  - elevation: 190 m (620 ft)
- Mouth: Mleczna
  - location: at the border of the Żakowice and Wośniki districts of Radom
  - coordinates: 51°22′56″N 21°06′52″E
  - elevation: 157 m (515 ft)
- Length: 10 km (6.2 mi)

Basin features
- Progression: Mleczna→ Radomka→ Vistula→ Baltic Sea

Strumień Godowski is a river of Poland, a tributary of the Mleczna.
