= Franciszek Florian Czaki =

Franciszek Florian Czaki (Csaky de Kerestszegh) (died in 1772) was a cartographer, engineer, captain of the Polish artillery. He was a Hungarian national. One of the most prominent cartographers of the last Polish king Stanisław August Poniatowski (since 1765). In (1772), he made a set of 24 detailed maps of Poland scaled 1:629 000 "Carte de Pologne...", planned several canals in Poland and in Lithuania, including the Królewski Canal (en: Royal Canal).
