= Trams in Navapolatsk =

Electric tram system in Navapolatsk, Belarus

Navapolatsk tramway network
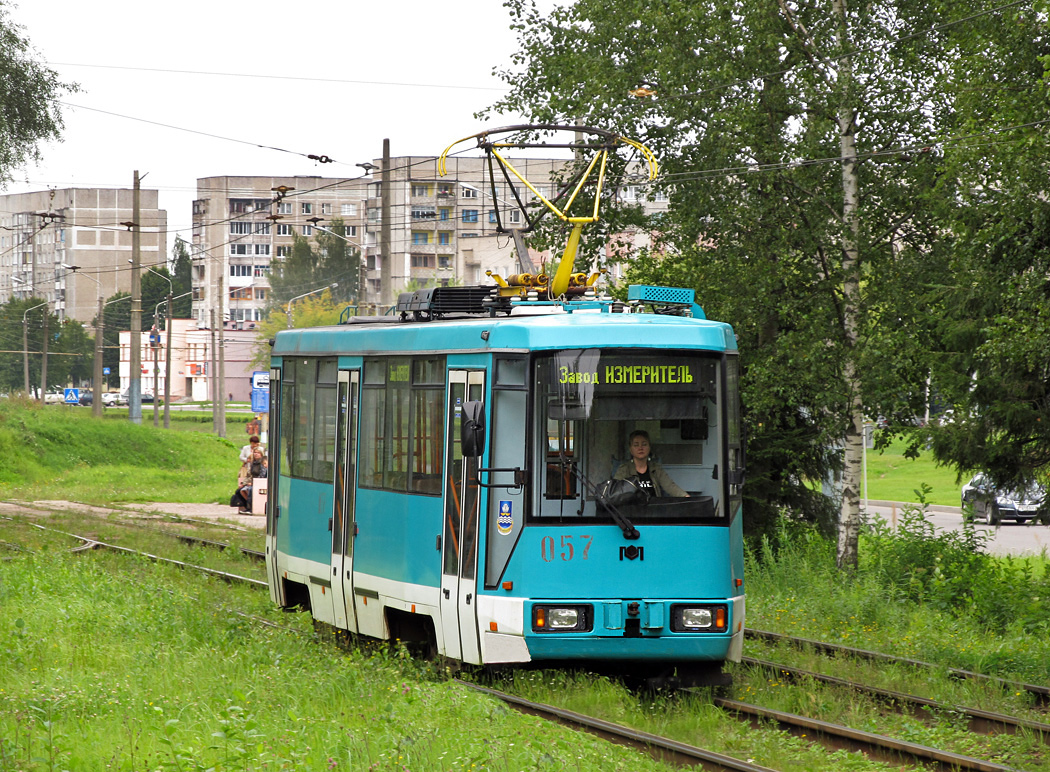

Operation
- Locale: Navapolatsk, Belarus
- Open: May 21, 1974

Infrastructure
- Track gauge: 1,524 mm (5 ft)
- Stock: 38 (32 line and 6 service vehicles)

Statistics
- Route length: 11.5 km (7.1 mi)
- 2011: 2.5 million
Overview

The Navapolatsk tramway network is a public transport system in Navapolatsk, Belarus.
