= Dneprobugvodput =

Dneprobugvodput is a state enterprise responsible for managing the Dnieper-Bug Canal in Belarus.

== Waterways ==
Along with Belvodput and the Dnieper-Berezinsky Enterprise, Dneprobugvodput is one of three organisations responsible for operating waterways in Belarus; it manages the Dnieper-Bug Canal, and related streams. There are plans to restore European waterway E40, linking the Baltic and the Black Sea with funding from the EU, although this has taken many years. Dneprobugvodput is optimistic that the restoration will allow modal shift, containerisation, and also some passenger transport.

== Operations ==
Dneprobugvodput is based in Pinsk. As of 2015, Sergei Zubko was deputy director-general.

Extensive dredging is needed to maintain channel depth.

Although Belarus has dedicated shipping companies, Dneprobugvodput has also attempted to operate river cruises; it also operates hydroelectric stations, including one in Pinsk.
