= Trams in Minsk =

Electric tram system in Minsk, Belarus

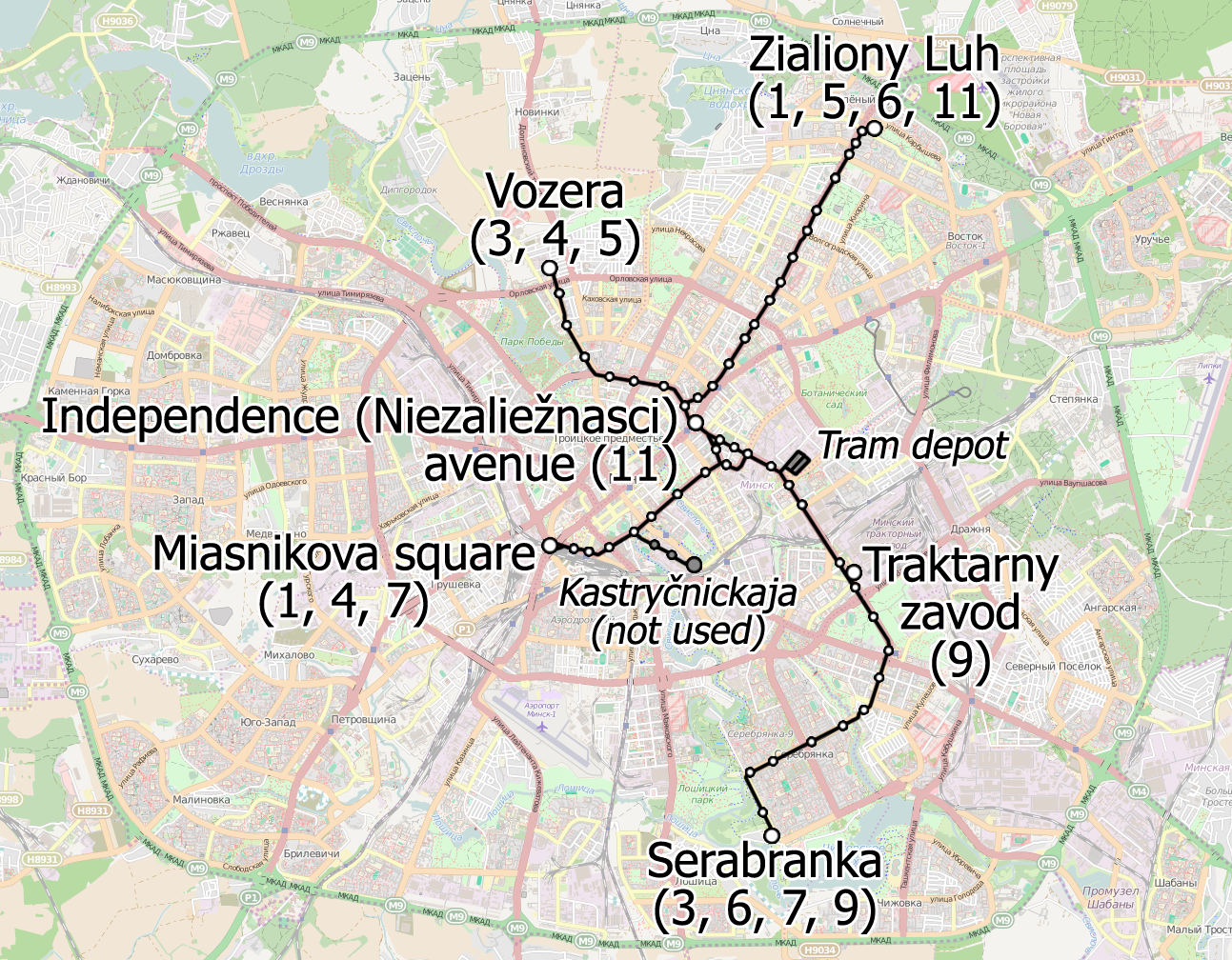
- The Minsk tram network in 2018

Overview
- Locale: Minsk, Minsk Region, Belarus
- Transit type: Tram line
- Number of lines: 10

Operation
- Began operation: 22 May 1892 (horse trams); 13 October 1929 (electric trams)
- Operator: Minsktrans
- Number of vehicles: 151 including types: * АКСМ-60102, * АКСМ-843, * АКСМ-1М & * АКСМ-743

Technical
- System length: 123.12 km (76.50 mi) (total track length)
- Track gauge: Russian broad gauge
- Electrification: 600 V DC overhead lines

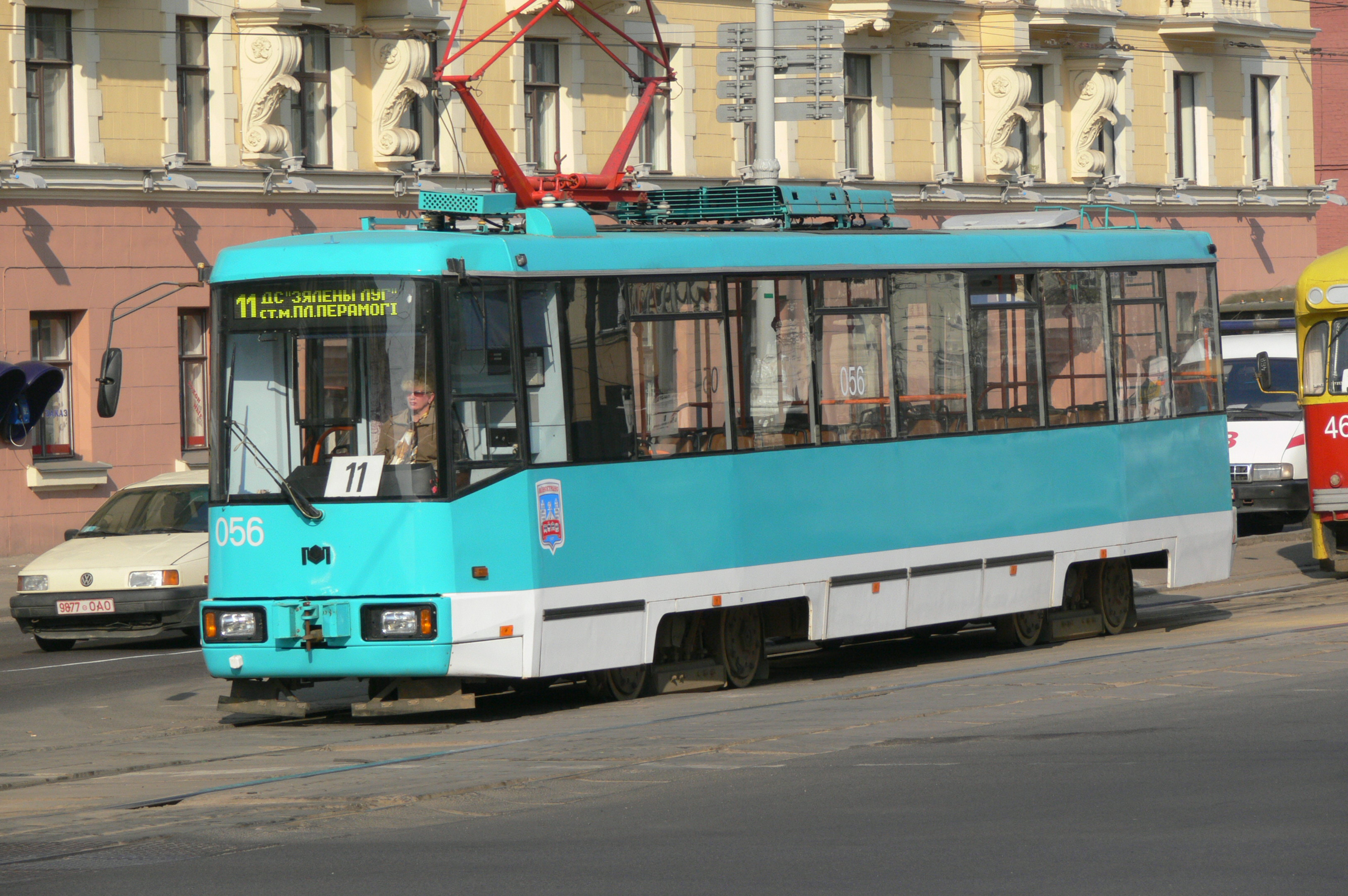
АКСМ-60102 in Minsk (2006)

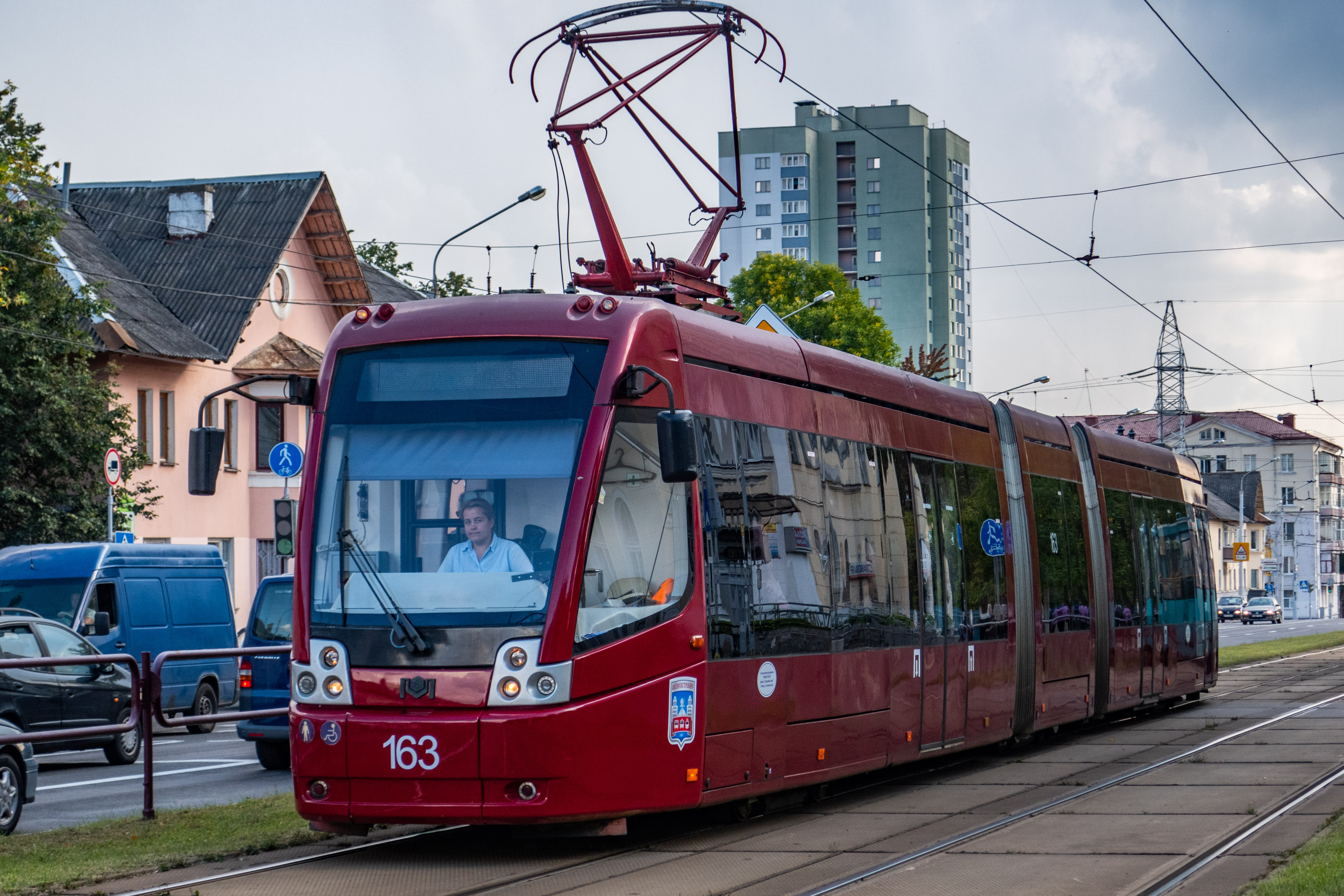
AKCM-843 in Minsk (2019).

The Minsk tram (Belarusian: Мінскі трамвай, romanized: Minski Tramvaj) network is organised into 10 routes, integrated with the city's trolleybus, Metro and bus services. It uses a Russian broad gauge, which remains the standard in the former soviet union.

Trams, initially using horse traction, have been operating in Minsk, the Belarusian capital, since 1892. At that time the entire territory was part of the Russian Empire. Services were interrupted for a few years following the 1917 Russian Revolution and again during the Second World War.

Minsk used horse trams for longer than many other cities, but a programme of tram electrification took place during the 1920s.

== Network ==
The focus of the network is two sets of lines crossing through the city centre, with a small ring/loop section in the central district. There are five terminus turning loops at the ends of the lines (one of which splits shortly before reaching its western end points). There are also three terminus-style turning loops positioned approximately mid-way along a couple of the lines: these serve additional, shorter, routes.

== Tram fleet ==
In recent years the network has been operated mainly by trams from the local manufacturer, Belkommunmash. Before that, most of the vehicles came from the Latvian RVR company, some of which have been rebuilt. The RVR-6 was introduced to the network in 1966 and by 1981 was said to have become the only tram type in regular use. 24 Tatra T6B5 trams were acquired in 1991, followed in 2003, by ten twenty year old GT8M tramcars from the city of Karlsruhe: the Germans handed over the trams for free, stating that this was cheaper than paying to scrap them, while the Belarusians were confident of being able to undertake cost-effectively the principal modification, which involved adapting the axles for the wider Russian gauge.

The local Belkommunmash company is currently completing development of a low-floor fourth generation tram for the city: the first examples are currently in service on a test basis.

== History ==
Evolution of the system since 1945

=== Horse trams ===
The history of the tram network starts with the opening of a horse tram on 22 May 1892, following two years of construction by the "Company for city and suburb horse-railways in Minsk". This came in the wake of massive population growth, from 5,500 in the 1860s to 91,000 by the end of the century, and after several decades during which horse-drawn omnibus services had proliferated across the booming city. Horse trams were already well established in other major Russian cities, and were considered safer and more comfortable than the horse omnibuses at a time when city streets were generally unpaved. By 1900 a horse-tram line connected two of the principal main-line rail stations, and a slow process now began creating a wider network centred on this. In 1909 the network was taken over by the "Russian Company of Urban and Suburban trams" and in 1913 it was transferred into the ownership of the city authorities.

Between May 1918 and 7 August 1921 the trams stopped, thanks to the First World War and the Civil War that followed the 1917 Russian Revolution.

=== Electric trams ===
A major upgrade, which some sources identify as the beginning of the modern tram network in Minsk, started on 20 January 1928 and concluded on 13 October 1929. This marked the formal opening of a new system, now using electrically powered trams. The old one meter gauge had been replaced with standard Russian broad gauge. At this stage there were two routes:

- "Tovarnaya station" - "Komarovka" («Товарная станция» — «Комаровка») served 9 permanent tram halts and a further 4 request halts.
- "Main station" - "Freedom Square" («Вокзал» — «площадь Свободы») served 2 permanent tram halts and a further 1 request halt

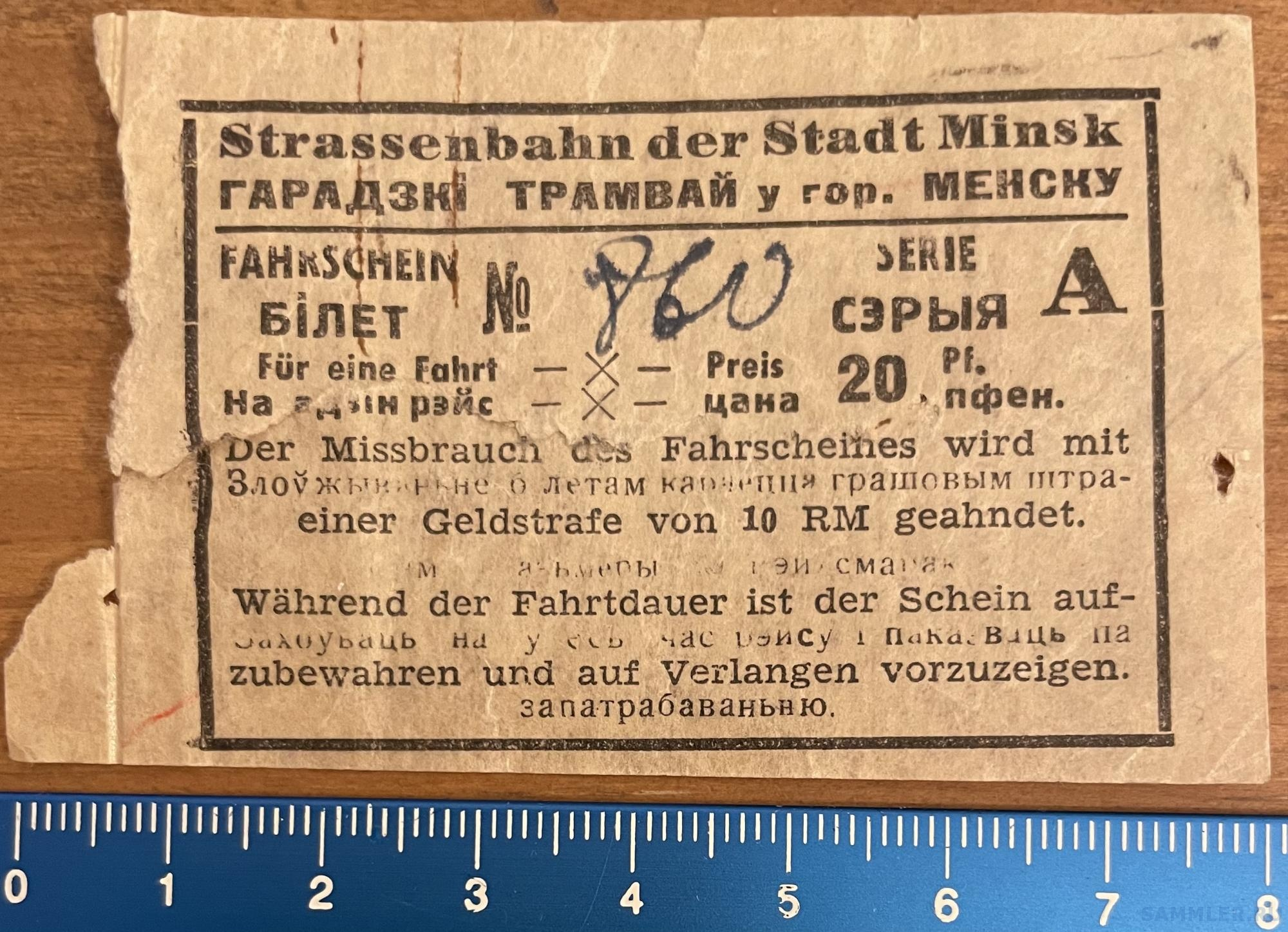
Tram ticket from Minsk from the time of German occupation 1943 - 1944 for 20 Reichspfennig.

In 1929 approximately 18-19,000 passengers used the trams each day, and the tram cars were also being used for carrying freight. The early 1930s saw a steady expansion of the network. By 1934 the system had been extended further and was organised into seven routes, serviced by 6 tramcars over a total line distance of 33 km (21 mi). In 1939 there were 70 tramcars for passengers and the total length of the tramlines had grown to 36.8 km (22.9 mi).

=== More war and its aftermath ===
The trams stopped again with the German invasion in June 1941. Under occupation, one line was restarted in May 1943, but as the tide turned of war turned the trams stopped running again in June 1944, and the retreating German armies took with them substation equipment and blew up important tram infrastructure as they left.

After the war it took some time for services to get back to normal.

The post war years saw a big growth in motor bus and trolleybus operations in Minsk. In August 1951 the city sent 26 workers from the tram department to retrain as trolleybus drivers and in March 1952 the city's tram and trolleybus services were merged into a single operation. Nevertheless, work on extending the Minsk tram network also continued, and by there were tram routes totalling 48 km (30 mi), serviced by 122 tramcars. A major investment in the 1960s funded a new tram depot, completed in 1966, with capacity for 250 tramcars, and there was also investment in electrically heated points for the tram network.

=== Minsk Metro ===
Work started on the Minsk Metro in 1977, and the first of its two lines opened in 1984. The second opened in 1990. On 30 June 1984 tram lines were removed from main streets in the busy centre of Minsk, and the tram network assumed the configuration which it currently (2015) retains.
