= Radomka =

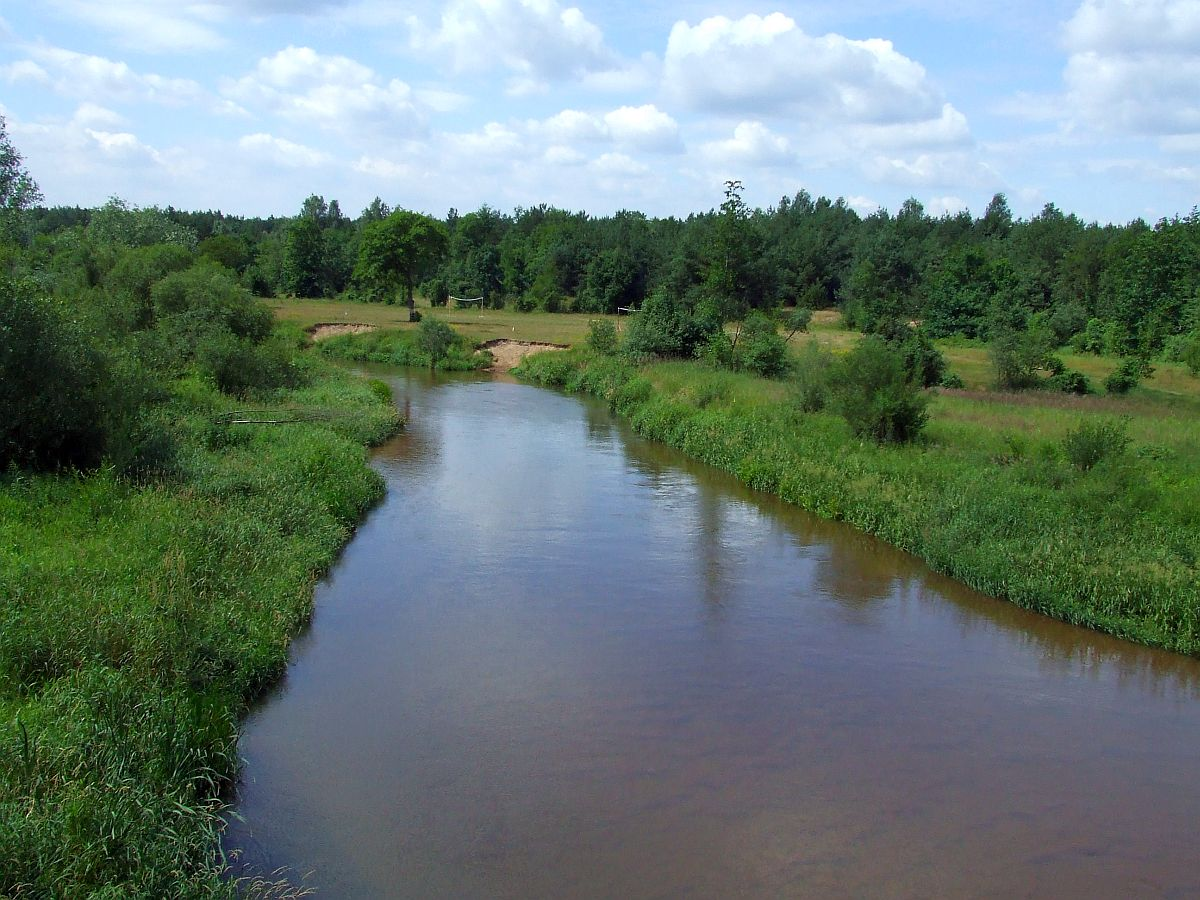

Location
- Country: Poland

Physical characteristics
- Mouth
  - location: Vistula
  - coordinates: 51.7087°N 21.4353°E

Basin features
- Progression: Vistula→ Baltic Sea

The Radomka is a river in central Poland and a left-bank tributary of the Vistula. It has a length of 98 km and a basin area of over 2000 km^{2} (all in Poland). The river has its source in forests 4 km south of Przysucha, at a height of 310 meters above sea level. There is a retention reservoir, built in the valley of the Radomka in Domaniów, which has the largest surface area of any lakes in Mazowsze Voivodeship (5 – 7 km^{2}). It is also utilised for recreation purposes.

After flowing through the hills of the Lesser Poland Upland, the Radomka enters a wide urstromtal, to finally join the Vistula near Ryczywol, at 160 meters above sea level.

== Puszcza Nature Reserve ==
The reserve, located in a forest at the source of the Radomka, was opened in 1978. It aims to preserve natural wilderness, with its fir and beech trees.

== Towns along the Radomka ==
- Przysucha
- Wieniawa
- Mniszek
- Przytyk

== Main tributaries ==
- Mleczna
- Narutówka
- Jastrzębianka
- Szabasówka
