= Pina (river) =

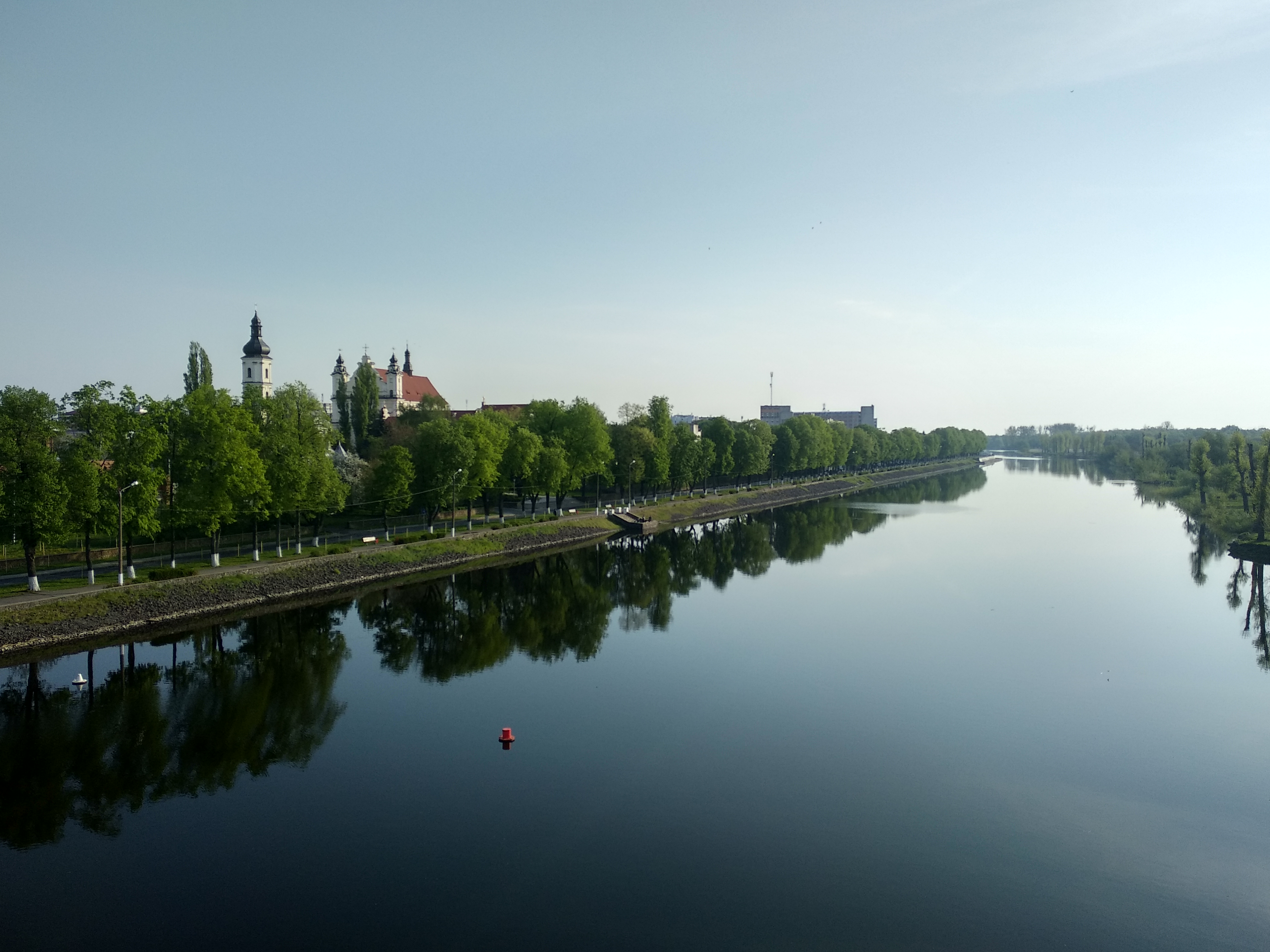

Location
- Country: Belarus

Physical characteristics
- Mouth: Pripyat
  - coordinates: 52.1175°N 26.1227°E
- Length: 40 km (25 mi)
- Basin size: 2,460 km^{2} (950 sq mi)
- Discharge
  - average: 8.6 m^{3}/s (300 cu ft/s)

Basin features
- Progression: Pripyat→ Dnieper→ Dnieper–Bug estuary→ Black Sea

The Pina (Belarusian: Піна; Russian: Пина) is a river in Ivanava and Pinsk Raions in Belarus. The 40 kilometers long river flows into the city of Pinsk and is a left tributary of the Pripyat. The average gradient of the Pina is 0.1 ‰. Its largest tributaries are the Struha and Njaslucha. It forms part of the Dnieper-Bug Canal.

== Books ==
- (in Belarusian, Russian and English) T.A.Khvagina (2005) POLESYE from the Bug to the Ubort, Minsk Vysheysha shkola, ISBN 985-06-1153-7,
- (in Russian, English and Polish) Ye.N.Meshechko, A.A.Gorbatsky (2005) Belarusian Polesye: Tourist Transeuropean Water Mains, Minsk, Four Quarters.
