= Kostrena =

- Municipality
- Kostrena Municipality; Općina Kostrena
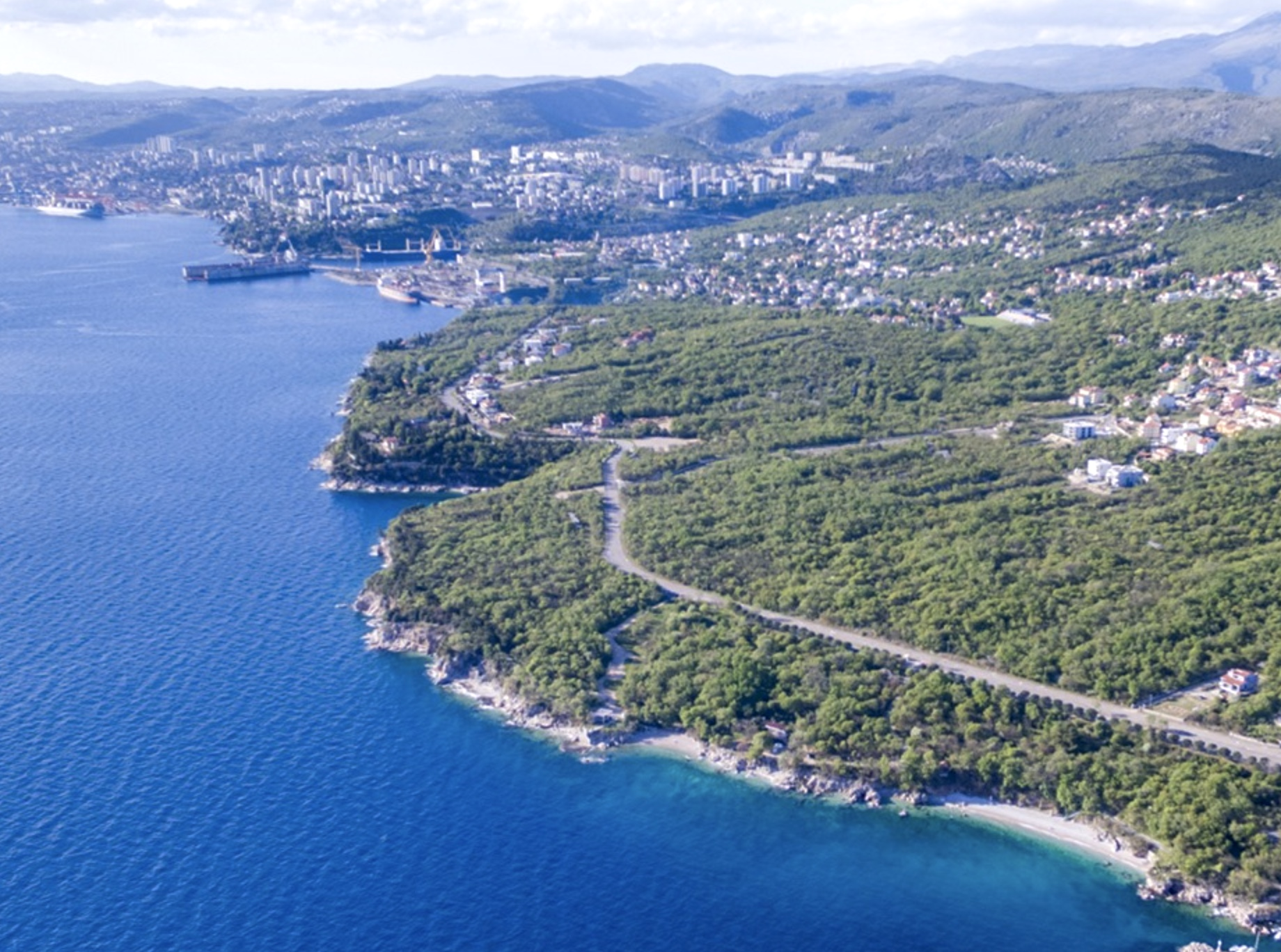
- Kostrena

- Location within Croatia
- Coordinates: 45°18′26″N 14°29′54″E
- Country: Croatia
- County: Primorje-Gorski Kotar County

Government
  - Mayor: Dražen Vranić (Ind.)
  - City Council: 11 members: HNS-AM-ARS (3); _; HDZ (3); _; SDP-PGS-HSU-HSS-IDS-R-ZS (3); _; Independents (3); _; Independents (1)

Area
  - Municipality: 12.0 km^{2} (4.6 sq mi)
  - Urban: 12.0 km^{2} (4.6 sq mi)

Population (2021)
  - Municipality: 4,398
  - Density: 367/km^{2} (949/sq mi)
  - Urban: 4,398
  - Urban density: 367/km^{2} (949/sq mi)
- Time zone: UTC+1 (CET)
  - Summer (DST): UTC+2 (CEST)
- Area code: 051
- Website: kostrena.hr

Kostrena (Italian: Costrena) is a Croatian municipality east of Rijeka on the Kvarner Bay. It is famous for its beaches and a long tradition of seafaring and seamanship. Because of its rocky beaches and a walkway that goes along the shoreline, it is very popular for recreation and sports. A scenic hill walk called Trim-staza is located on the northeast side of Kostrena. There have been some archeological excavations in Kostrena, discovering ruins from the Roman times. Lately, urban development has been increasing. Kostrena is also an industrialized suburb of Rijeka. An oil refinery and an oil power plant are located at Urinj and a shipyard Viktor Lenac is located in the bay of Martinšćica.

== Buildings ==
- TE Rijeka

== Sports ==
The local soccer club is NK Pomorac.

Kostrena is a popular place for scuba diving, offering a number of dive centers to do shore dives as well as some close shipwrecks located in the Kvarner Bay.

== Monuments and sights ==
=== Art installation "Lacing Svežanj" ===
The art-design collective Numen/For Use devised the design of site-specific urban beach equipment and plans for the reorganization of the Svežanj beach in Kostrena. One piece of each such equipment, a prototype, is permanently placed on and around the aforementioned beach. The prototypes consist of new showers, a changing room, 3 types of benches that can be used on the renovated lookout, a refurbished lifeguard tower and a mast for the Blue Flag.
