= Helix Producer 1 =

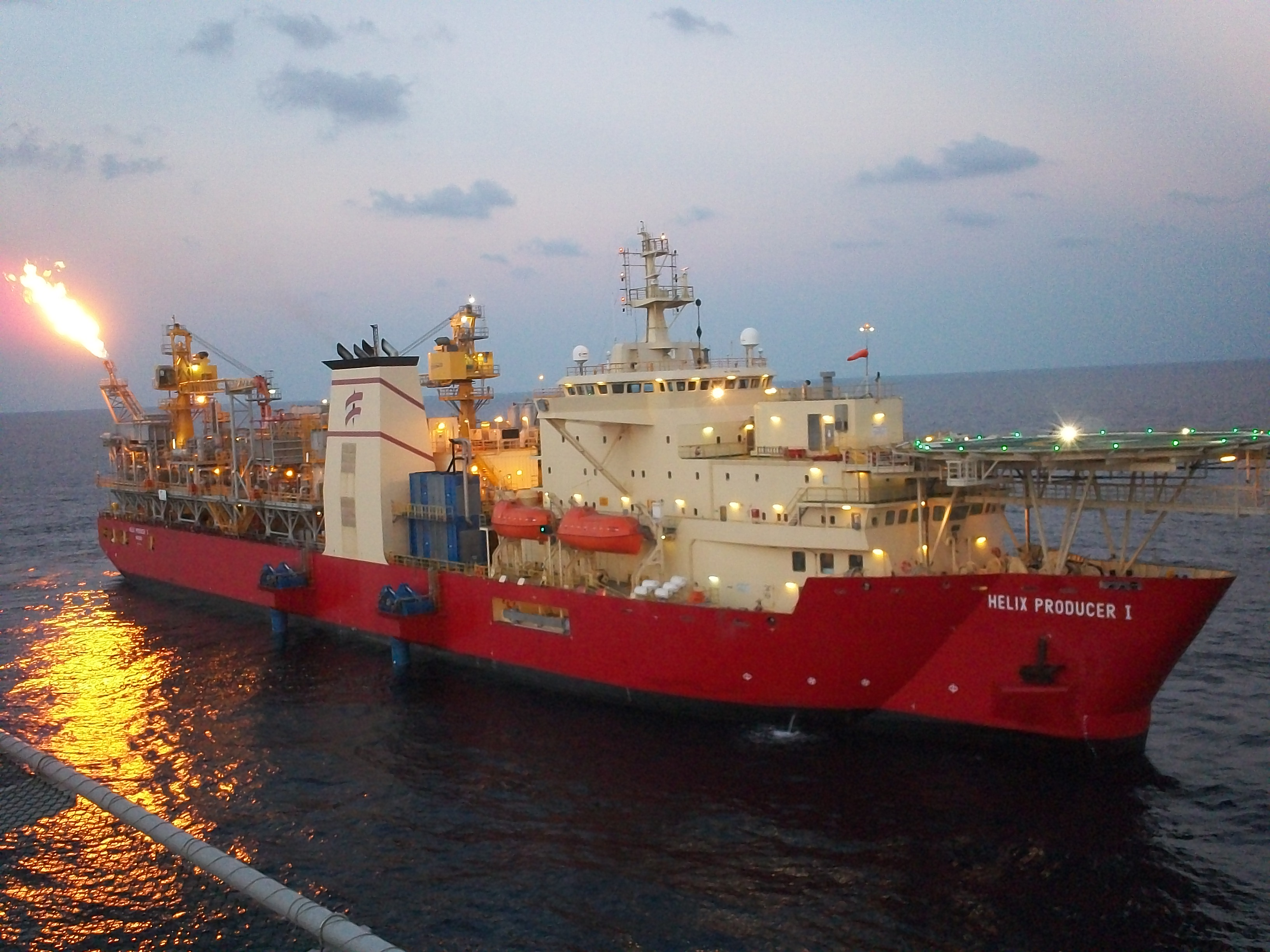
- Helix Producer I seen flaring natural gas in the Gulf of Mexico over the Phoenix Field.

History
- Name: Helix Producer I; Karl Carstens (1986–2009)
- Owner: Kommandor LLC
- Operator: Helix Energy Solutions Group
- Port of registry: Bahamas, Nassau
- Builder: Howaldtswerke-Deutsche Werft, Viktor Lenac Shipyard
- Acquired: 2 May 1986
- Identification: Call sign: C6RK2; DNV ID: 30158; IMO number: 8420115
- Status: Operational

General characteristics
- Type: Multi-purpose offshore vessel
- Tonnage: 17,357 GT
- Length: 161.5 m (530 ft)
- Beam: 29 m (95 ft)
- Draught: 8.6 m (28 ft)
- Depth: 14 m (46 ft)
- Capacity: Oil: 30,000 bbl/d (4,800 m^{3}/d); Gas: 70×10^{6} cu ft/d (2.0×10^{6} m^{3}/d); Water: 50,000 bbl/d (7,900 m^{3}/d)

Helix Producer I is a ship-shaped monohull floating production and offloading vessel, converted from the ferry MV Karl Carstens. It has no storage capability.

== MV Karl Carstens ==
The ship was built in 1986 for Deutsche Bundesbahn as a roll-on roll-off (RORO) ferry serving on the Vogelfluglinie, a connection between Fehmarn, Germany and Denmark. It remained in service from 1986 until 1997.

== Helix Producer I ==
The ship was reconfigured as a Floating Production vessel and converted between 2006–2008 at the Viktor Lenac Shipyard in Croatia. Topside production facilities were designed by OFD Engineering in Houston, Texas and installed in 2009 at the Kiewit shipyard in Corpus Christi, Texas, United States.

Helix Producer I has a Disconectable Transfer system (DTS) designed and supplied by Flexible Engineered Solutions LTD (FES), UK, and consists of a riser buoy supporting sub-sea risers and control umbilicals that would be connected to a deep water well and can be released from the hull, allowing the vessel to move out of the way of an approaching hurricane. After the storm, the vessel would return to the site and reconnect the buoy resuming normal oil extraction. It is operated by the Helix Energy Solutions Group and was scheduled to operate on the Phoenix Oil Field in the Gulf of Mexico, but on 14 June 2010 Helix announced that the ship would be directed to assist BP at the Deepwater Horizon oil spill site.

In its new configuration the ship has a length of 161.5 m (530 ft), a breadth of 29 m (95 ft) (increased from before 18 m (59 ft)), a depth of 14.2 m (47 ft), and a draft of 8.6 m (28 ft). The vessel has a maximum displacement of 29,000 t (29,000 long tons; 32,000 short tons), and as a light ship of 9,475 t (9,325 long tons; 10,444 short tons).

=== Service at Deepwater Horizon site ===
In June 2010, BP announced that Helix Producer I would join Discoverer Enterprise and Toisa Pisces at the Deepwater Horizon site to process oil that is flowing from the deepwater well. While Discover Enterprise can process about 18,000 barrels (760,000 US gallons; 2,900 cubic metres) of oil per day, Helix Producer I can handle about 30,000 barrels. The estimate of the uncontrolled oil flow at that time was up to 60,000 barrels. It was anticipated that Helix Producer I would be used for 2 months for this mission. Oil from Helix Producer I was to be offloaded by a shuttle tanker. Starting in early August mud, later cement was pumped into the well, eventually closing it, so that by 19 September 2010, it could be announced that the Macondo Well had been finally killed.
