= Blue Ridge-class command ship =

US Navy class of amphibious command and control ships

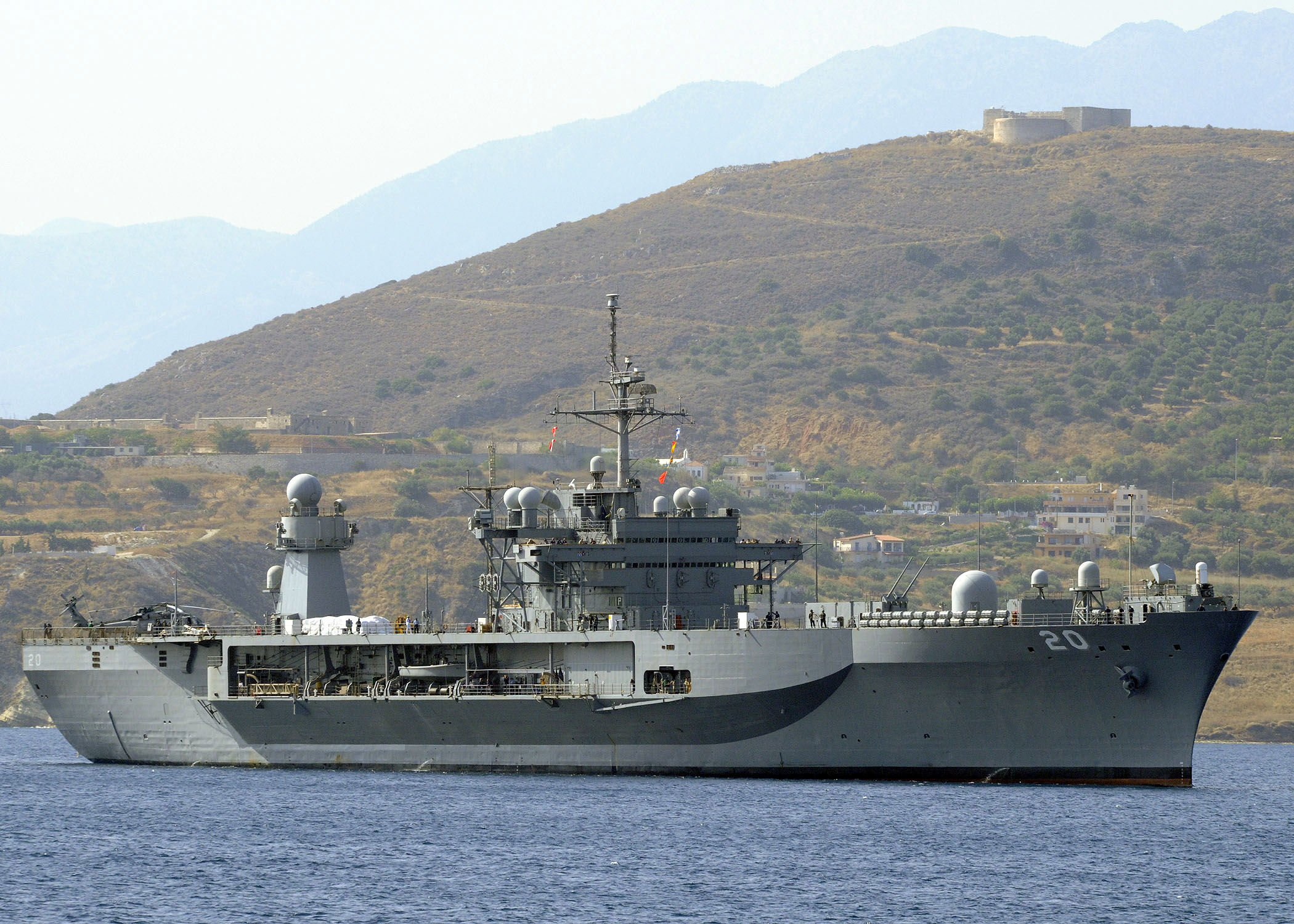
- USS Mount Whitney

Class overview
- Name: Blue Ridge Class
- Builders: Philadelphia Naval Shipyard - LCC 19; Newport News Shipbuilding and Drydock Co. - LCC 20
- Operators: United States Navy
- In commission: 1970 - Present
- Planned: 3
- Completed: 2
- Canceled: 1
- Active: 2

General characteristics
- Displacement: 18,874 long tons (19,176.89 metric tons) full load
- Length: 634 ft (193 m)
- Beam: 108 ft (33 m)
- Draft: 26 ft 9 in (8.15 m) full load
- Propulsion: Two boilers, one geared turbine, one shaft; 22,000 hp (16,000 kW)
- Speed: 23 kn (26 mph; 43 km/h)
- Range: 13,000 nmi (24,000 km; 15,000 mi) at 16 knots (30 km/h)
- Complement: 564 enlisted, 34 officers
- Armament: 2 × Phalanx CIWS; 2 × Mark 38 25 mm machine gun system
- Aircraft carried: All helicopters except the CH-53 Sea Stallion can be carried

The Blue Ridge class is the first and only class of amphibious command and control ships to be specifically designed as such from the keel up.

The Blue Ridge class resulted from almost seven years of planning and construction work. Under the designation SCB-248 (later SCB-400.65), the hull of the Iwo Jima-class amphibious assault ship was used as the basis of the design due to the flight deck's ability to distance antennas to minimize interference between the ships' multiple communications systems and to the deck's ability to act as a ground plane; the LPH island was replaced with a small centralized superstructure.

As designed, the Blue Ridge class was capable of supporting the staff of both the Commander of an Amphibious Task Force and the staff of the Commanding General of the Landing Force. The ships were the most advanced joint amphibious command-and-control centers constructed at the time, due to their advanced computer systems, extensive communications package and modern surveillance and detection systems.

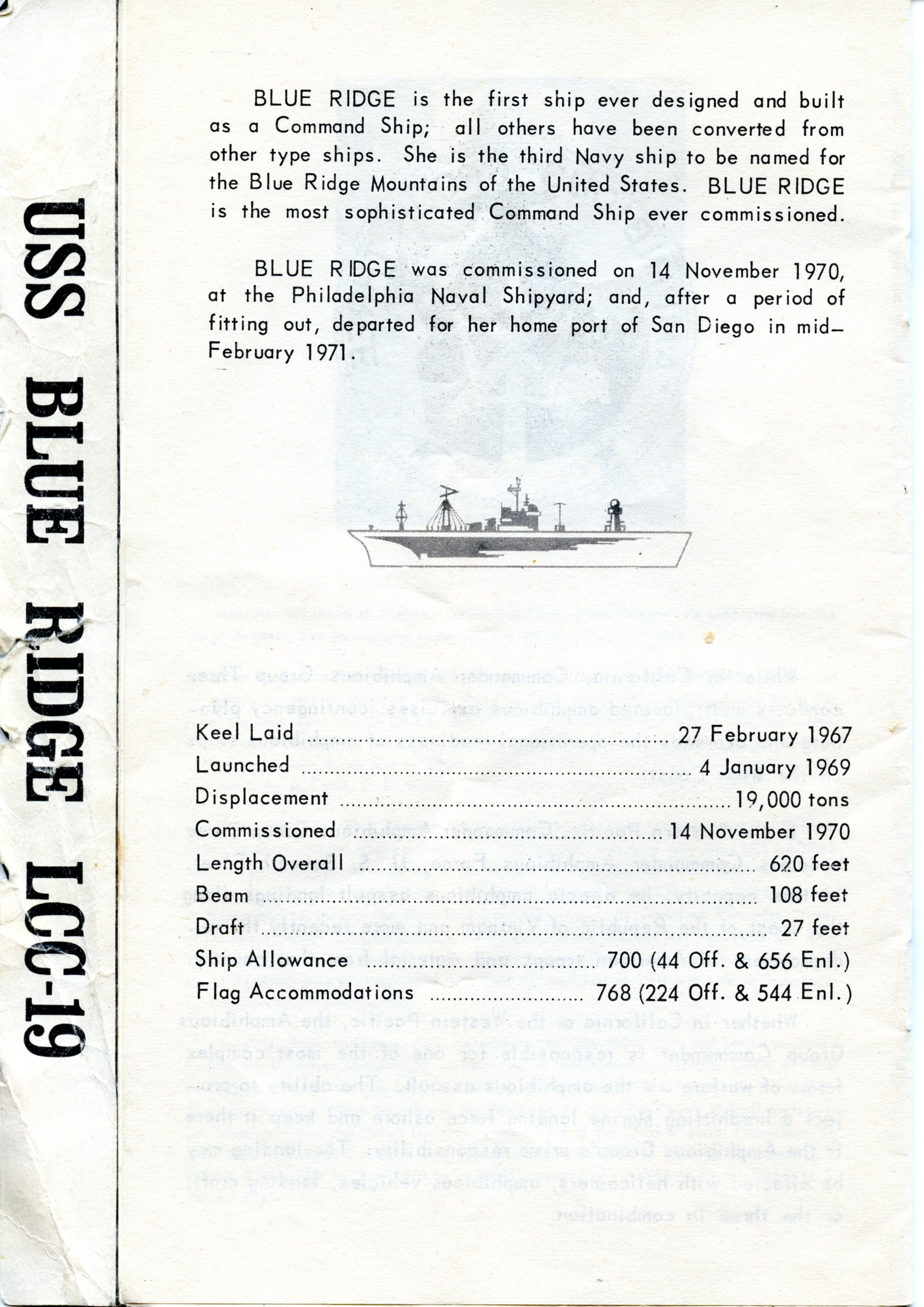
Original specifications

At the time of their commissionings, the ships of the Blue Ridge class had the distinction of carrying the world's most sophisticated electronics suites, thirty percent larger than that of the aircraft carrier USS John F. Kennedy, which had been the most complex. They were fitted with a "main battery" of computers, communications gear, and other electronic facilities to fulfill their mission as command ships. An advanced communications system was also an integral part of the ships' radical new design. Through an automated patch panel and computer controlled switching matrix her crew could use any combination of communication equipment desired.

US Navy long-range communications were heavily reliant on high frequency radio systems in the 1970s and have evolved to predominantly satellite communications in the 2000s. This was illustrated by the long wire antennas, discone antennas, and directional HF yagi or log-periodic antenna initially installed on the class and later removed and replaced with a number of satellite communications antennas.

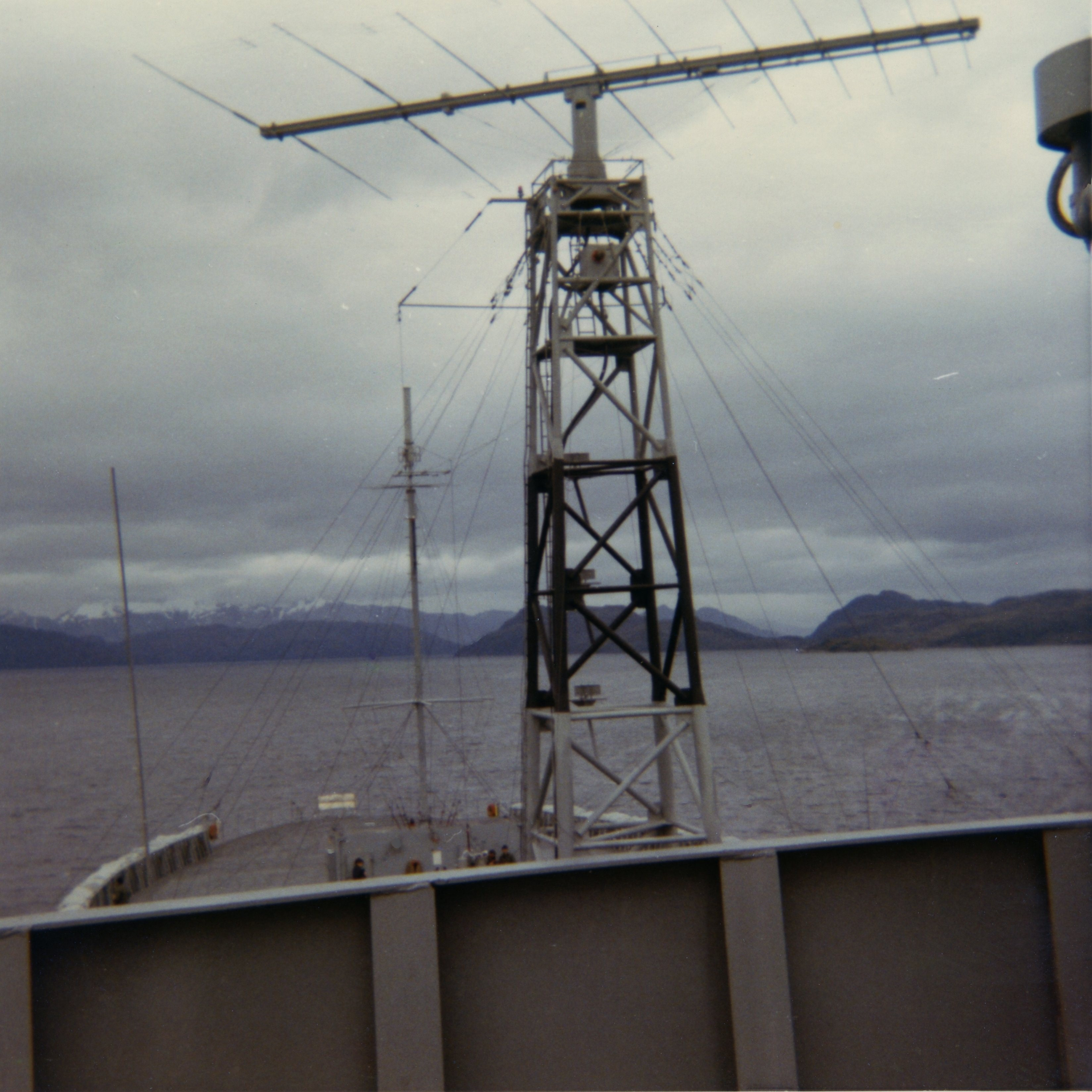
Discone (forward) and log-periodic antennas on the Blue Ridge in 1971

Besides small arms, the Blue Ridge class was initially armed with two twin Mark 33 3"/50 caliber guns at commissioning, though they have since been removed. They also carried two Mark 25 launchers and electronics for the Basic Point Defense Missile System (BPDMS) which was added sometime in the 1970s and removed in the 1990s. Two 20 mm Phalanx CIWS systems were added in the 1980s for point defense. In recent years they have also carried Mk 38 25 mm Bushmaster cannons.

The Blue Ridge class consists of two ships. Originally six were requested, three were planned, and only two were built.

== Ships in class ==
Name	Hull Number	Builder	Ordered	Laid Down	Launched	Commissioned	Status
Blue Ridge	LCC-19	Philadelphia Naval Shipyard	31 December 1964	27 February 1967	4 January 1969	14 November 1970	Active in service
Mount Whitney	LCC-20	Newport News Shipbuilding & Drydock Company	10 August 1966	8 January 1969	8 January 1970	16 January 1971	Active in service
