= USS Mount Whitney =

Blue Ridge-class amphibious command ship

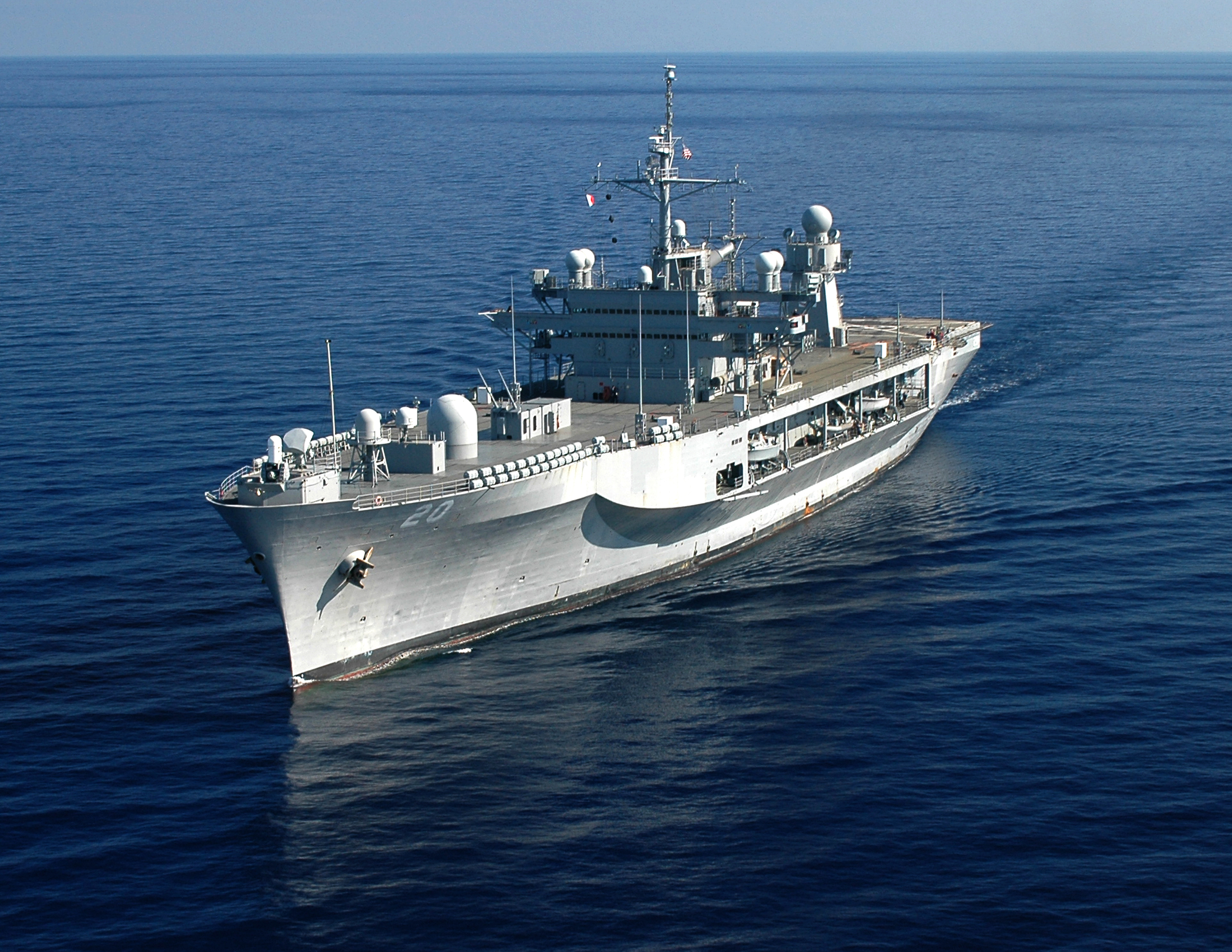
- USS Mount Whitney (LCC-20)

History

United States
- Name: USS Mount Whitney
- Namesake: Mount Whitney
- Ordered: 10 August 1966
- Builder: Newport News Shipbuilding & Drydock Company
- Laid down: 8 January 1969
- Launched: 8 January 1970
- Commissioned: 16 January 1971
- Home port: Gaeta, Italy
- Identification: MMSI number: 111853581; Callsign: NOGB
- Motto: The Voice of The Sea
- Status: In active service
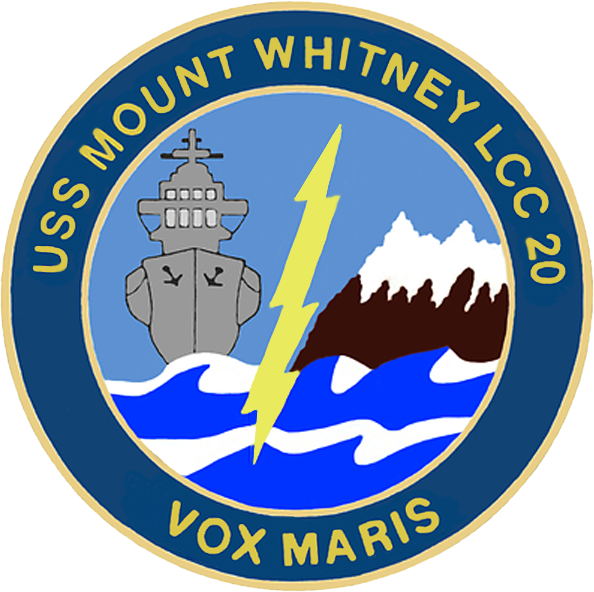
- Badge

General characteristics
- Class & type: Blue Ridge-class command ship
- Displacement: 18,400 tons full load
- Length: 189 m (620 ft 1 in)
- Beam: 33 m (108 ft 3 in)
- Draft: 906.78 cm (29 ft 9.00 in) full load
- Propulsion: Two boilers, one geared turbine
- Speed: 23 knots (43 km/h; 26 mph)
- Capacity: 930
- Complement: 170 officers and enlisted; 155 Military Sealift Command civilian sailors
- Armament: 2 × Phalanx CIWS; 2 × 25 mm Bushmaster cannons; 4 × 0.5 in (12.7 mm) machine guns, Mark 36 SRBOC chaff rockets
- Aircraft carried: 1 × helicopter, currently a MH-60S Knight Hawk

USS Mount Whitney (LCC/JCC 20) is one of two Blue Ridge-class amphibious command ships of the United States Navy and is the flagship and command ship of the United States Sixth Fleet. USS Mount Whitney also serves as the Afloat Command Platform (ACP) of Naval Striking and Support Forces NATO (STRIKFORNATO). The ship had previously served for years as the COMSTRIKFLTLANT(NATO Designation) / US Second Fleet's command ship. She is one of only a few commissioned ships to be assigned to Military Sealift Command.

Mount Whitney was classified as LCC-20 on 1 January 1969, and her keel was laid down on 8 January by Newport News Shipbuilding & Drydock Company, Newport News, Virginia.

At the time of her commissioning, Mount Whitney joined her sister ship Blue Ridge as having the distinction of carrying the world's most sophisticated electronics suites. It was said to be some thirty percent larger than that of the aircraft carrier USS John F. Kennedy, which had been the most complex. Mount Whitney was armed with a "main battery" of computers, communications gear, and other electronic facilities to fulfill her mission as a command ship. An extremely refined communications system was also an integral part of the ship's radical new design. Through an automated patch panel and computer-controlled switching matrix, her crew could use any combination of communication equipment desired. The clean topside area is the result of careful design intended to minimize the ship's interference with her own communications system. US Navy long-range communications were heavily reliant on high-frequency radio systems in the 1970s and have evolved to predominantly satellite communications in the 2000s. This is illustrated by the long wire antennas and the directional HF yagi or log-periodic antenna initially installed on Mount Whitney and later removed and replaced with a number of satellite communications antennas.

== Ship's name ==
The ship is named for Mount Whitney, a peak in the Sierra Nevada mountain range of California. Mount Whitney is the highest summit in the contiguous United States, with an elevation of 14,505 feet (4,421 m).

== Capability ==
Mount Whitney is a Command, Control, Communications, Computer, and Intelligence (C4I) ship. She incorporates various elements of advanced C4I equipment and gives the embarked Joint Task Force Commander the capability to effectively command all units under their command.

Mount Whitney can transmit and receive large amounts of secure data to and from any point on earth through HF, VHF, UHF, and SHF (satellite) communications channels. This electronic technology enables the Joint Intelligence Center and Joint Operations Center to provide timely intelligence and operational support to the rest of the Navy.

== Ship history ==
=== 1970s and 1980s ===
From 1971 to 2005, Mount Whitney served as the flagship for Commander Second Fleet/Commander Striking Fleet Atlantic.

=== 1990s ===
In 1994, during the FleetEx 2/94 "George Washington" war game exercise, the Argentine Navy, acting as the enemy and using the diesel submarine ARA San Juan, went undetected, penetrated the destroyer defense and "sank" Mount Whitney, which was acting as the command ship during the exercise.

Mount Whitney deployed in 1994 to Haiti with Lieutenant General Hugh Shelton, the commander of the XVIII Airborne Corps, in command of the Joint Task Force that conducted Operation Uphold Democracy.

=== 2000s ===
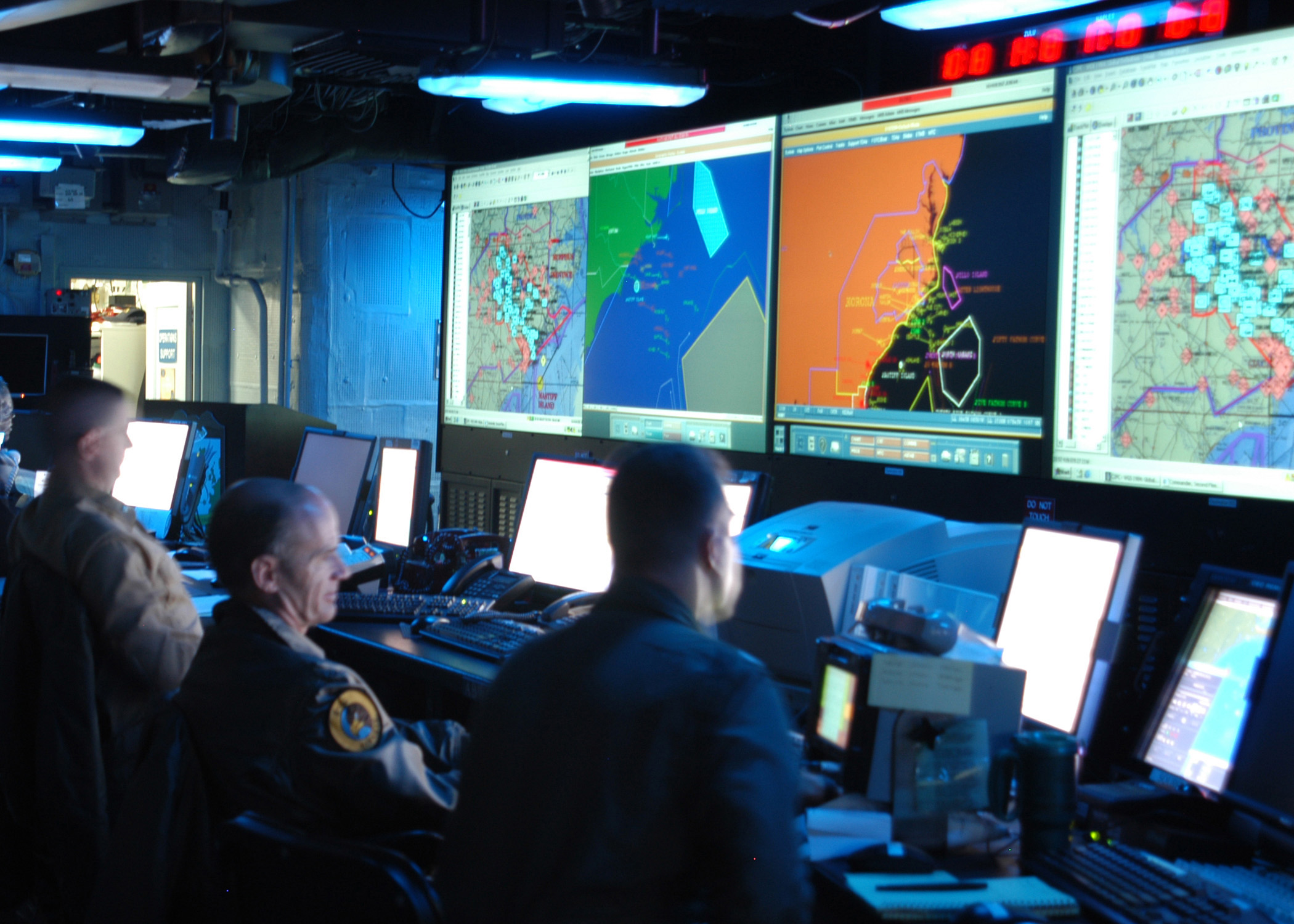
Joint Operations Center watch standers aboard the command ship Mount Whitney in 2005

On 12 November 2002, Mount Whitney deployed to the Central Command area of responsibility in support of Operation Enduring Freedom. She was acting as the initial command post for Combined Joint Task Force – Horn of Africa. During the deployment, the ship embarked elements of the 2nd Marine Division and II Marine Expeditionary Force (II MEF), based at Camp Lejeune, North Carolina, under the command of Major General John F. Sattler and Captain Morton W. Kenyon.

In 2004, Military Sealift Command civilian sailors were integrated into her crew. She remains a commissioned warship in the United States Navy, but the size of her crew was reduced from about 600 sailors to about 170 Navy officers and enlisted personnel and 155 civilians.

In February 2005, Mount Whitney left Norfolk for Gaeta, Italy where she was redesignated (LCC/JCC 20) and assumed duties as the 6th Fleet flagship, officially relieving USS La Salle. She also assumed duties as the command ship for the Commander, Joint Command Lisbon and the Commander, Striking Force NATO.

In August 2008, Mount Whitney was deployed to the Black Sea in support of Operation Assured Delivery to deliver humanitarian aid to those affected by the Russo-Georgian War and became the first NATO ship to deliver aid to port of Poti, Georgia.

On 6 November 2008, Mount Whitney was unable to enter the port at Sevastopol. City authorities and representatives of the Ukrainian Navy refused to comment on the event. Individuals working for the city administration reported that the failure was due to issues with Mount Whitney's border crossing documents, while others suggested anti-NATO protests were the cause.

=== 2010s ===
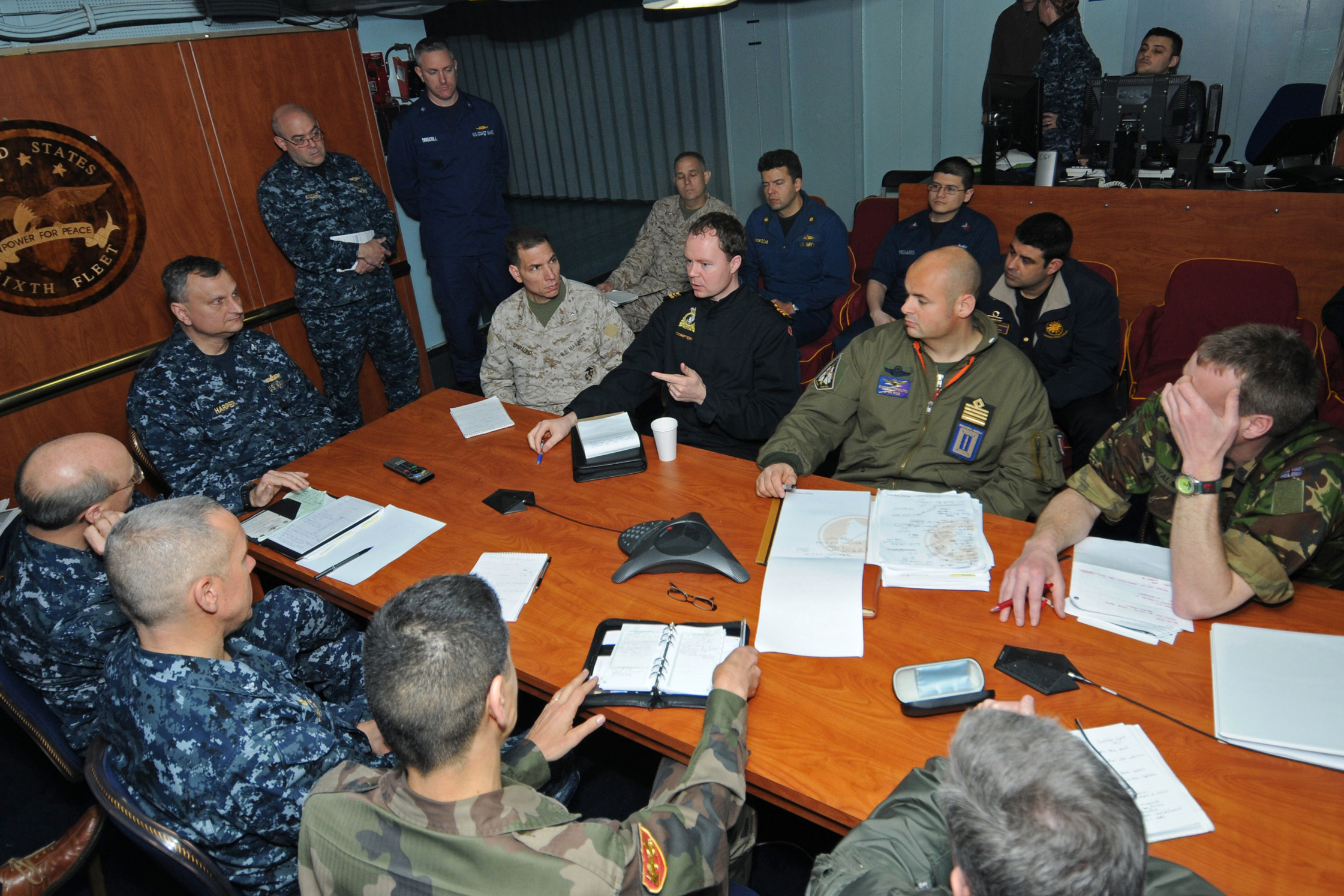
Officers from coalition countries meet aboard Mount Whitney while off the coast of Libya during Operation Odyssey Dawn

From 19 March 2011, Mount Whitney served in the Mediterranean as the main command vessel for the enforcement of United Nations Security Council Resolution 1973 against Libya. She was the flagship for Admiral Samuel J. Locklear, who had tactical command of the Operation Odyssey Dawn joint task force. The vessel was serving as a command-and-control vessel for the United States' involvement in the coalition campaign aimed to enforce a Libya no-fly zone and prevent Muammar Gaddafi's forces from attacking the rebel stronghold of Benghazi.

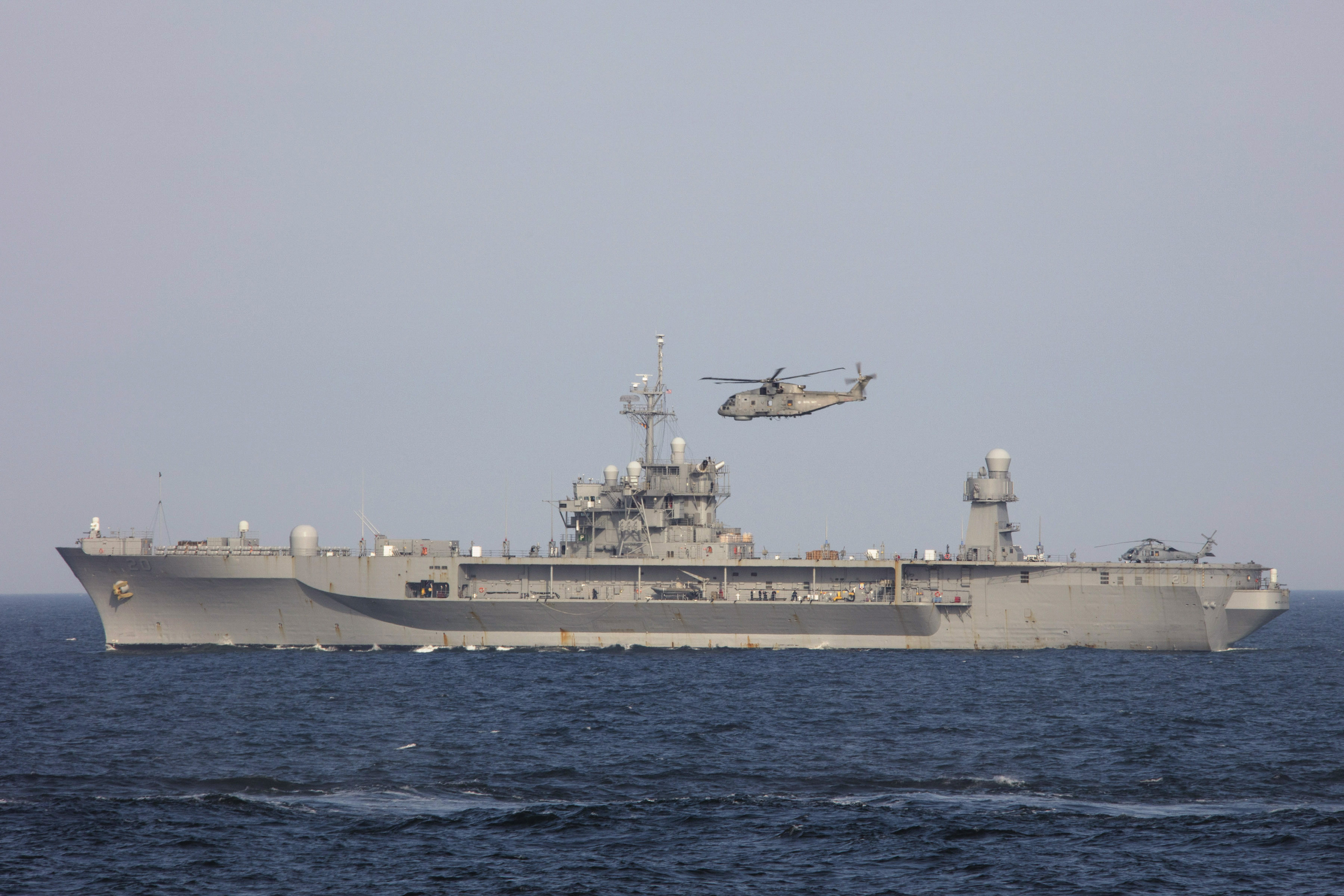
British Merlin helicopter overhead during BALTOPS 20

In February 2013, Mount Whitney transferred to the San Giorgio del Porto Shipyard in Genoa, Italy for a major 60-day overhaul and repair project. The ship returned to active duty in April 2013 at the end of the maintenance window.

On 31 January 2014, Mount Whitney left her homeport of Gaeta, Italy. Mount Whitney, along with USS Taylor, were the first two US Navy ships to operate in the Black Sea during the Sochi Olympics.

On 31 July 2015, a fire broke out aboard Mount Whitney while she was in Viktor Lenac Shipyard, Rijeka, Croatia. There were no reported injuries, and the fire was extinguished within 45 minutes by ship's crew and shipyard fire brigade personnel. Mount Whitney had been in Viktor Lenac Shipyard since January 2015 undergoing a scheduled maintenance overhaul designed to extend the service life of the ship to 2039.

On 30 June 2016, Mount Whitney visited Klaipėda, Lithuania, and in October 2016, she visited Souda Bay, Greece.

From early 2017 through to October 2017, Mount Whitney was at the Viktor Lenac Shipyard; Rijeka, Croatia, for further upgrades to its information technology infrastructure, and various engineering refurbishments.

In September 2018, Mount Whitney visited Thessaloniki, Greece, for the 83rd Thessaloniki International Fair, where the US was the country of honor. From 25 October to 7 November 2018, she served as the command vessel for the NATO exercise Trident Juncture.

=== 2020s ===
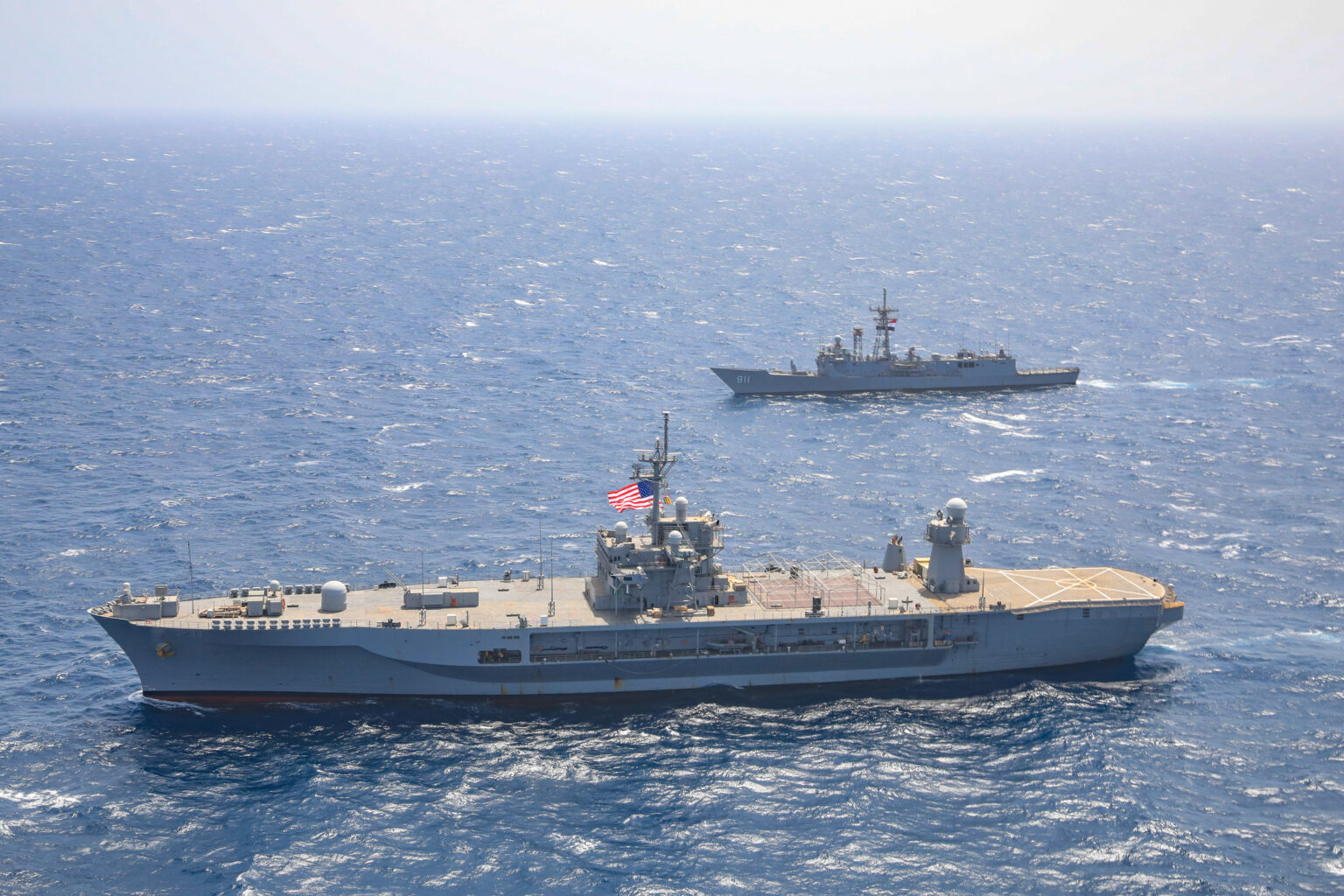
Mount Whitney escorted by the Egyptian Navy frigate Alexandria, April 2022.

In April 2022, the Combined Maritime Forces command, a 34-nation organization based in Bahrain, has added a new task force led by Mount Whitney. There are three task forces that handle piracy and security issues both inside and outside of the Persian Gulf. The new task force of two to eight ships at a time would target those smuggling coal, drugs, weapons, and people in the waterway. In late May 2022, Mount Whitney was operating in the Baltic Sea, ahead of naval exercise BALTOPS 2022. The ship is currently stationed in Gaeta, Italy.

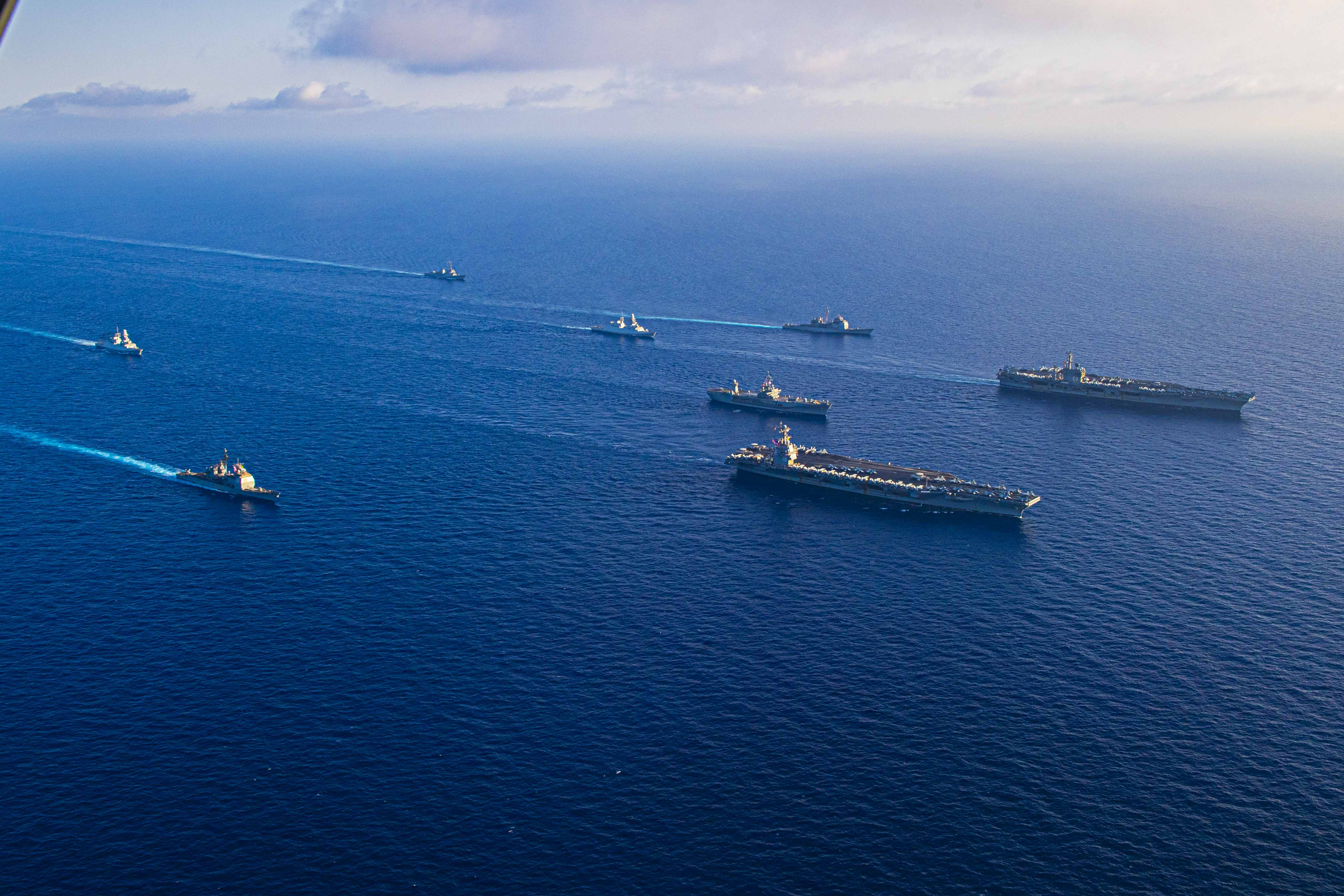
Mount Whitney (center) flanked by the USS Dwight D. Eisenhower and USS Gerald R. Ford carrier strike groups in the Mediterranean Sea, November 2023.

On 18 October 2023, Mount Whitney deployed from Gaeta with the Commander 6th fleet, Vice Adm. Thomas Ishee, and his staff, onboard "in support of U.S. operations" in the eastern Mediterranean Sea in waters off the Gaza war. This added to new deployments by the USS Dwight D. Eisenhower aircraft carrier strike group and USS Bataan, USS Mesa Verde and USS Carter Hall carrying the 26th Marine Expeditionary Unit, joining the USS Gerald R. Ford strike group.

== Awards ==
- Navy Unit Commendation with 2 awards
- Navy Meritorious Unit Commendation with 2 awards
- Naval Battle "E" Ribbon with 11 awards
- National Defense Service Medal with 2 awards
- Armed Forces Expeditionary Medal
- Global War on Terrorism Expeditionary Medal
- Kosovo Service Medal with 2 awards
- United Nations Medal
