= Rijeka Thermal Power Station =

Former oil-fired power station in Kostrena, Croatia

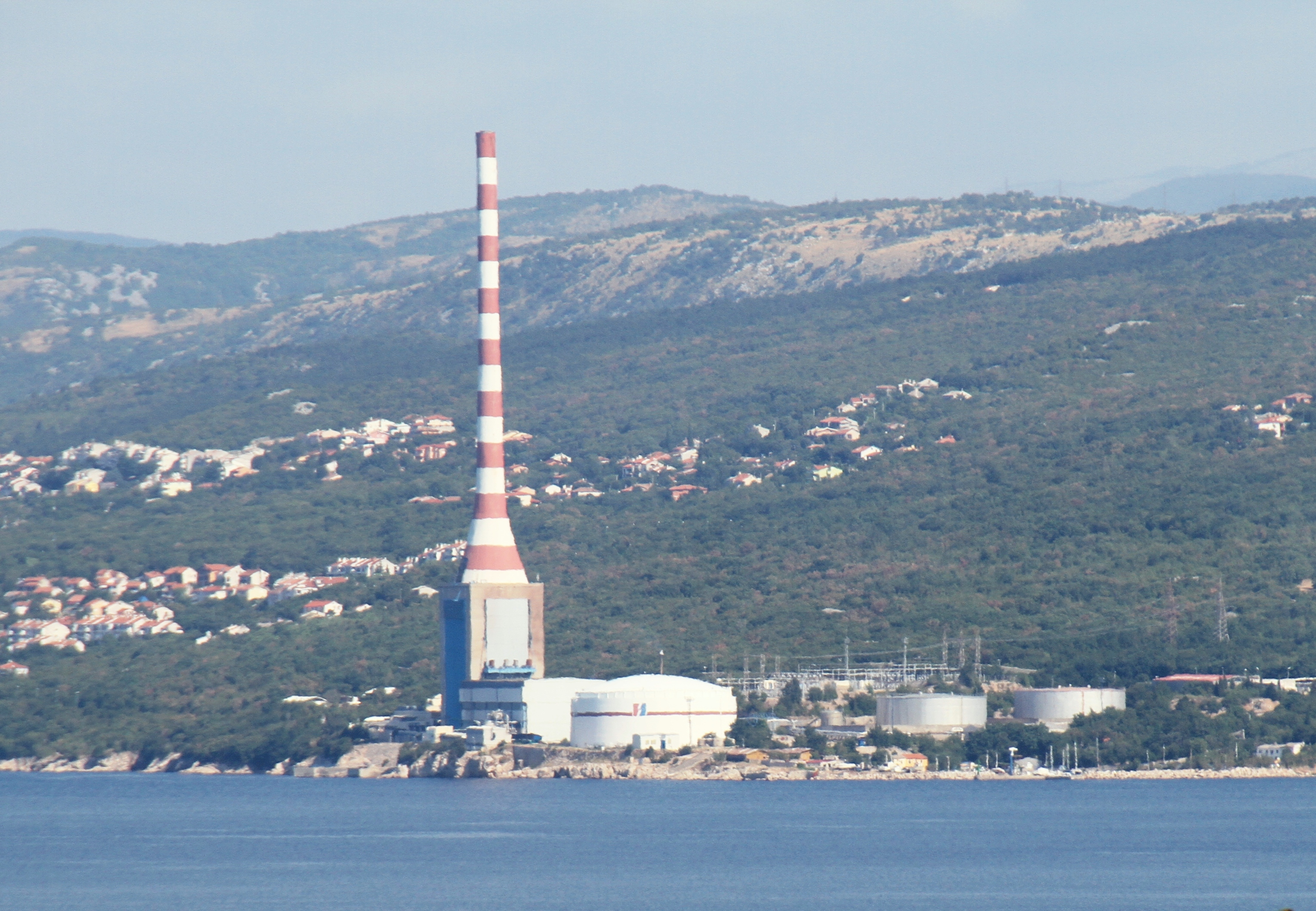
- Rijeka Thermal Power Station
- Official name: Termoelektrana Rijeka
- Country: Croatia
- Location: Kostrena, Primorje-Gorski Kotar County
- Coordinates: 45°17′10″N 14°31′14″E
- Status: Closed
- Construction began: 1974
- Commission date: 1978
- Owner: Hrvatska elektroprivreda
- Operator: HEP Proizvodnja

Thermal power station
- Primary fuel: Fuel oil

Power generation
- Units decommissioned: 1 × 320 MW
- Nameplate capacity: 320 MW

External links
- Commons: Related media on Commons

The Rijeka Thermal Power Station ({Croatian: Termoelektrana Rijeka, TE Rijeka), also known as TE Urinj, was an oil-fired power station in Kostrena, immediately southeast of Rijeka, Croatia. It was operated by Hrvatska elektroprivreda (HEP) through HEP Proizvodnja.

The power station consisted of a single 320 MW steam-electric generating unit. Construction began in 1974 and the unit entered service in 1978.

The plant was designed to burn liquid fuel, primarily heavy fuel oil (mazut). Its location on the coast provided access to maritime infrastructure and cooling water, while the plant was situated next to the Rijeka Refinery complex at Urinj.

The generating unit ceased operation at the end of 2023. HEP subsequently recorded the unit as subject to a decision terminating its operation.

== History ==
Construction of TE Rijeka began in 1974 and the 320 MW generating unit was commissioned in 1978.

The plant formed part of the Croatian electricity-generation system operated by HEP. It was one of Croatia's major conventional thermal power stations and was designed for operation using liquid fuel.

The station's main generating unit had a nominal electrical capacity of 320 MW. HEP documentation states that an overhaul of the high-pressure steam piping and boiler coolers in 2013 restored the unit to its nominal 320 MW output.

The power station was located on an industrial site covering approximately 123,000 m², near the Rijeka Refinery at Urinj.

== Technical characteristics ==
The plant had a single steam-electric generating unit with a nominal electrical output of 320 MW.

The unit used liquid fuel, principally heavy fuel oil. HEP's safety documentation described fuel storage facilities with capacities of approximately 20,000 m³ and 60,000 m³, together with fuel-pumping equipment and associated boiler systems.

The generating unit was designed as a conventional steam power plant, in which fuel combustion produced steam for a turbine-generator set.

== Operation ==
The station's annual electricity production varied substantially according to the operation of the Croatian electricity system and the availability of other generating sources.

A Croatian government environmental inspection report described the plant as having a nominal capacity of 320 MW and a capability for rapid load regulation over a range of approximately 100 to 320 MW.

In 2015, the plant generated 39 GWh of electricity, according to its safety report.

During periods when the unit was not generating electricity, it remained available for possible restart subject to operational and regulatory requirements.

== Environmental regulation ==
As a large combustion installation, TE Rijeka was subject to Croatian environmental regulations implementing European Union requirements for industrial emissions and large combustion plants.

The plant operated under a regime that allowed the use of a limited number of operating hours. HEP states that the exemption for a limited operating lifetime expired on 31 December 2023.

The Croatian national emissions monitoring report for 2024 records TE Rijeka as a large combustion plant with a thermal input of 800 MW and liquid fuel as the fuel. The operator reported zero operating hours for 2024 and stated that operation was not expected in 2025.

According to HEP, the environmental permit covering fuel combustion expired on 31 December 2023 together with the limited-lifetime exemption. HEP's management subsequently adopted a decision terminating operation of the 320 MW unit.

== Operation during the European energy crisis ==
The plant had been largely inactive for extended periods before being temporarily returned to operation during the European energy crisis.

HEP announced preparations for the restart of TE Rijeka in February 2023.

The national emissions report states that the plant operated from 6 to 12 February 2023.

In December 2023, HEP announced another planned start-up of the plant. The planned operation was connected with measures under the Croatian intervention plan for protecting the security of gas supply and maintaining electricity-system security.

The December 2023 operation occurred shortly before the expiry of the plant's limited-lifetime operating regime and environmental permit for fuel combustion.

== Closure ==
The limited-lifetime exemption applying to TE Rijeka expired on 31 December 2023. According to HEP, the expiry also affected the environmental permit for the plant's main activity, the combustion of fuel in installations above 50 MW thermal input.

HEP's management subsequently adopted a formal decision to terminate operation of the 320 MW block.

The Croatian national emissions report for 2024 recorded zero operating hours and stated that the operator did not expect the plant to operate in 2025.

As a result, the 320 MW generating unit is no longer an operating electricity-generating unit. The site and its associated infrastructure remain part of the HEP asset base.

== Environmental incidents ==
The plant has also been involved in environmental incidents associated with releases of oil into the sea.

In November 2022, an oil pollution incident occurred in the coastal area near the plant. The Municipality of Kostrena reported that the pollution was associated with an incident at TE Rijeka and that the plant's representatives participated in the subsequent remediation activities together with local and regional authorities.

The remediation included cleaning contaminated coastal areas and removing contaminated material for disposal.

The incident and its remediation were reported by local authorities and were separate from the later decision to terminate electricity generation at the plant.

== Future of the site ==
Following the termination of electricity generation, the future use and potential redevelopment of the industrial site is subject to decisions by its owner and the relevant Croatian authorities.

No new generating unit at the TE Rijeka site has been identified in the sources used for this article as having received approval for construction.

== See also ==
- Hrvatska elektroprivreda
- Energy in Croatia
- Electricity sector in Croatia
- List of power stations in Croatia
- Rijeka Refinery
- Kostrena
