= Viktor Lenac Shipyard =

Shipyard in Rijeka, Croatia

- Type: Joint-stock company
- ISIN: HRVLENRB0001
- Industry: Ship building
- Founded: 1896
- Headquarters: Rijeka, Croatia
- Key people: Sandra Uzelac

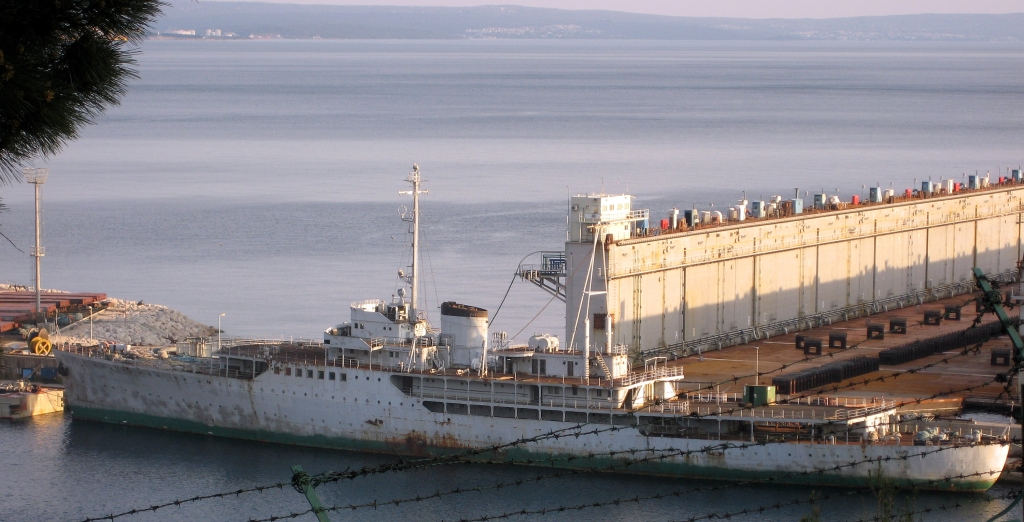
The yacht Galeb berthed at the Viktor Lenac Shipyard in 2008

The Viktor Lenac Shipyard (Croatian: Brodogradilište Viktor Lenac JSC or Shipyard Viktor Lenac d.d. (JSC)) is situated on the northern Croatian Adriatic coast, 3 km from the largest Croatian port. It was founded in 1896, and was among the first in the world to deal with ship lengthenings. It is quoted on the Zagreb Stock Exchange with ticker VLEN-R-B.

Today it has three floating dry docks, one accommodating vessels up to 160,000 dwt, more than 1,000 metres of berthing space, a large offshore construction site and it specializes in ship conversions and gas platform construction.

== History ==
In 1896 a ship repair facility for the merchant, naval and fishing vessel fleets of the Austro-Hungarian Empire was founded in Rijeka, the largest Adriatic port, under the name Lazarus. After the end of the Second World War, in 1948, the yard was nationalised and renamed Viktor Lenac.

In the late 1960s the shipyard was moved 3 kilometres to the south to its present location at Martinšćica Bay (Kostrena), which has an adequate water depth to accommodate vessels with deep draughts. The shipyard purchased two floating drydocks and cranes and put them in the bay. After this move, the yard rapidly developed its repair, conversion, and offshore capabilities. After a managerial reorganization in 1990, the shipyard was registered as a joint-stock company in 1993 and is today the only privately owned major shipyard in Croatia.

After being rescued several times by government guarantees, the company filed for bankruptcy in November 2003 with debts of €102 million, after the government refused to guarantee a loan of US$12 million. The bankruptcy process was completed in 2008 and Tankerska plovidba Co., Croatia's largest shipping company, became the largest shareholder, followed by the Uljanik Shipyard, Croatia's major builder of car carriers and dredgers.

In 2009 Floating Dock No. 11, that can accommodate vessels up to Suezmax size, was put into full operation after refurbishment.

In 2011, the shipyard won a competitive bidding process for a 60-day maintenance program on the American ship USS Mount Whitney, during which the shipyard was visited by the United States Ambassador to Croatia, and Frank Pandolfe, commander, U.S. 6th Fleet. The visit was said to have served to strengthen the bonds between the two countries.

Viktor Lenac completed extensive ship repair and dry-docking operations on the US Navy's 6th Fleet flagship USS Mount Whitney (LCC 20). This project utilized a significant portion of the shipyard's available resources throughout most of 2015. The scheduled works commenced in January 2015 and were finalized in August 2015. The contract included the complete overhaul and docking of the vessel, standard class surveys, the total renovation of onboard accommodations and galleys, as well as shell plating and deckhouse steel renewal. The technical specifications required the modification of the existing vessel's electrical power supply system alongside the installation of new generators, switchboards, and control mechanisms. Furthermore, refurbishment was performed on the fuel system, reverse osmosis system, black and gray discharge water systems, and the fire alarm infrastructure. Workers carried out UHP water blasting of the hull, ballast tanks blasting with steel shots, and the application of a full coating system. The scope of work also entailed the cleaning and gas freeing of all fuel tanks, and the conversion of existing internal spaces into a new auxiliary engine room, which included the installation of three new CAT generators, associated switchboards, and a dedicated control room. This represents the second time that Viktor Lenac has been awarded a contract for the USS Mount Whitney, following a previous period in 2011 when the ship underwent docking and class surveys at the facility.

== Notable conversions ==
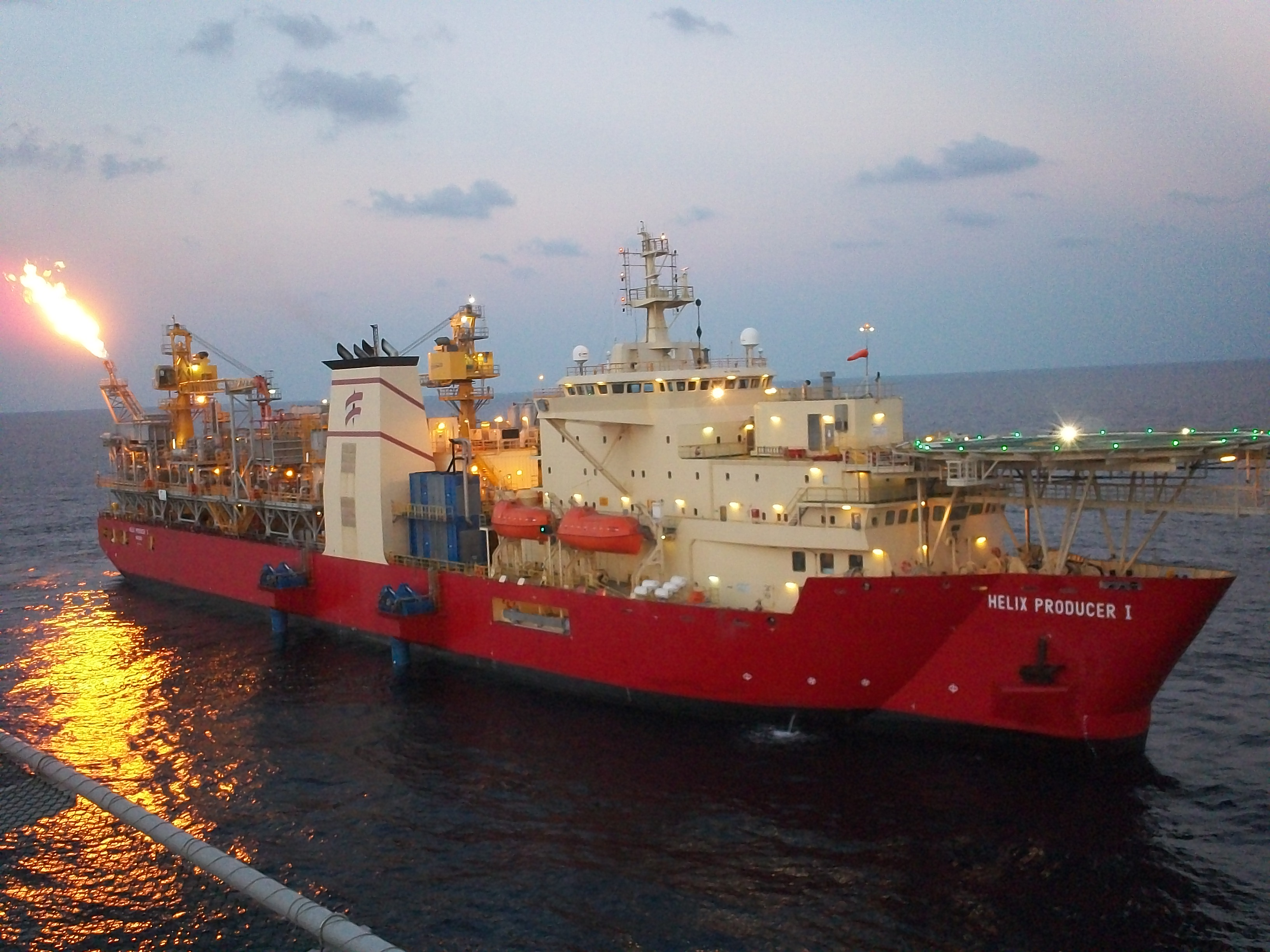
Helix Producer 1, ex-Kommandor 5000, converted in Viktor Lenac between 2006 and 2008

- The Helix Producer 1 was reconfigured as a FPSO vessel and converted between 2006 and 2008 at the Viktor Lenac Shipyard.
- Sampson, the crane and pipelay vessel, was converted in Lenac in 2012.
- Atlantic Navigator, the Stern Trawler, was extended and converted in Lenac in 2008.

== Notable ship repairs ==
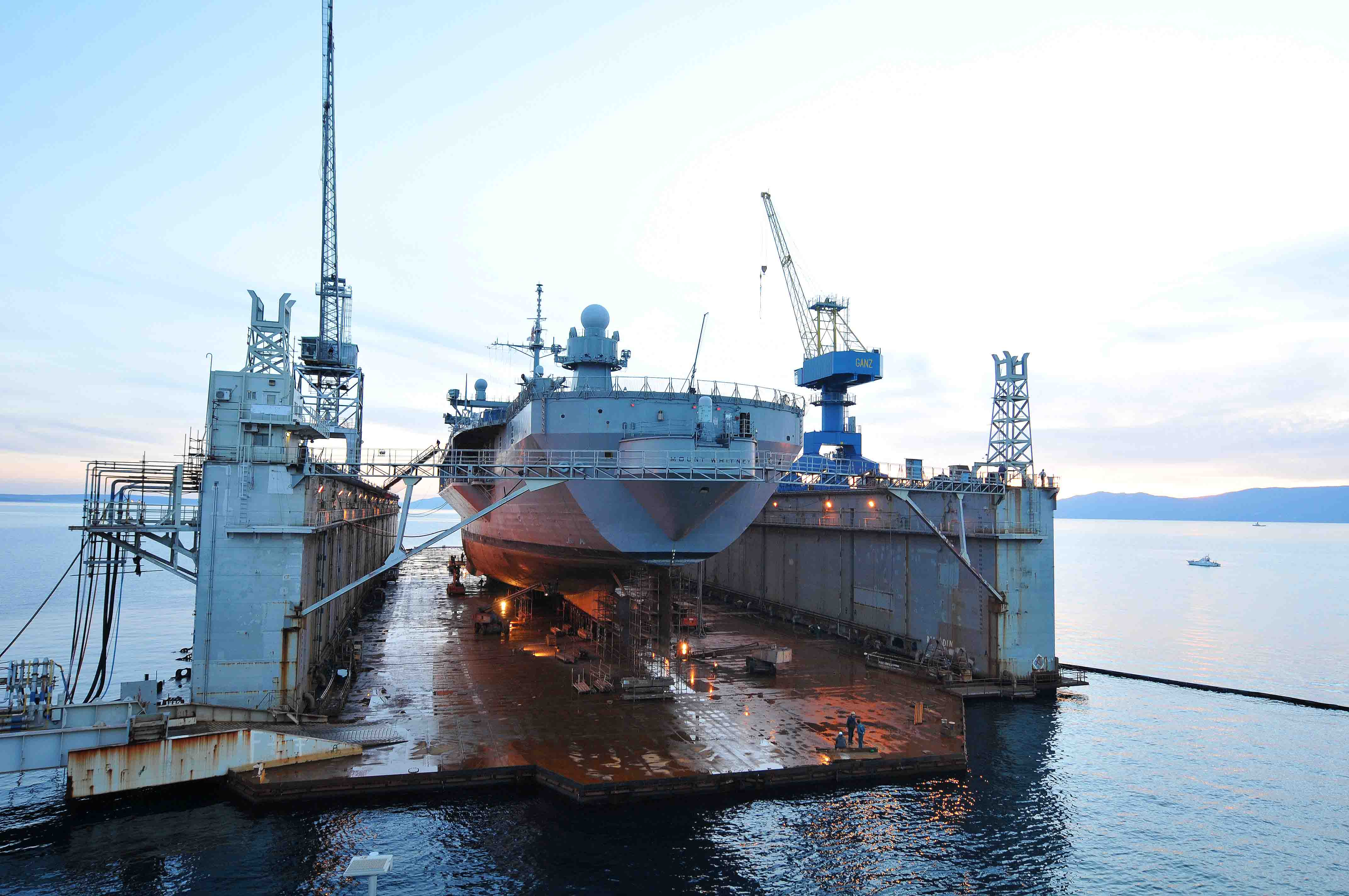
Mechanics from the Viktor Lenac shipyard begin working on the U.S. 6th Fleet command and control ship USS Mount Whitney (LCC-20) as it begins the drydock process and reconstruction in Rijeka, Croatia

- Saipem's semisubmersible rig Scarabeo 4 was maintained and repaired in Viktor Lenac in 2009.
- USS Mount Whitney, the amphibious command ship was repaired in 2011 and again in 2015 at the Viktor Lenac Shipyard
- Greek shipowner Aristotle Onassis's luxury yacht Christina O's reconstruction in 2001

== See also ==
- List of companies of the Socialist Federal Republic of Yugoslavia
