= List of decommissioned ships of the Polish Navy =

Since 1918

This is a list of decommissioned vessels of the Polish Navy and the Riverine Flotilla of the Polish Navy since 1918.

== Ships ==
=== Submarines ===
==== Decommissioned by 1946 ====
| Class / project | Displacement (tonnes) | Length (m) | Image | Ship | Commissioned | Decommissioned | Notes |
|---|---|---|---|---|---|---|---|
| Wilk class | surfaced: 980 submerged: 1,248 | 77.95 | | ORP Wilk | 31 October 1931 | 28 September 1946 | |
| Orzeł class | surfaced: 1,110 submerged: 1,473 | 84.0 | | ORP Orzeł | 2 February 1939 | 11 June 1940 | Lost with all hands during a patrol in the North Sea around the end of May or beginning of June 1940. |
| U class | surfaced: 540 submerged: 735 | 58.6 | | ORP Sokół | 19 January 1941 | 27 July 1946 | Leased to the Polish Navy, returned to the Royal Navy after the war and scrapped in 1949. |
| U class | surfaced: 540 submerged: 735 | 58.6 | | ORP Dzik | 12 December 1942 | 25 July 1946 | Leased to the Polish Navy and returned to the Royal Navy after the war; later transferred to the Royal Danish Navy and scrapped in 1958. |
| S-1 type | surfaced: 800 submerged: 1,062 | 66.0 | | ORP Jastrząb | 4 November 1941 | 2 May 1942 | Former USS S-25; transferred under Lend-Lease and sunk in the Norwegian Sea on 2 May 1942. |

==== Decommissioned after 1947 ====
| Class / project | Displacement (tonnes) | Length (m) | Image | Ship | Commissioned | Decommissioned | Notes | References |
|---|---|---|---|---|---|---|---|---|
| Wilk class | surfaced: 980 submerged: 1248 | 77.95 | | ORP Ryś | 2 August 1931 | 8 September 1955 | The vessels were scrapped in 1956. | |
| Wilk class | surfaced: 980 submerged: 1248 | 77.95 | | ORP Żbik | 20 February 1932 | 9 September 1955 | The vessels were scrapped in 1956. | |
| Orzeł class | surfaced: 1100 submerged: 1650 | 84.0 | | ORP Sęp | 16 April 1939 | 2 September 1969 | Scrapped in 1971–1972. | |
| M-XV series | surfaced: 283 submerged: 353 | 49.5 | | ORP Kaszub | 5 June 1954 | December 1963 | Former Soviet vessel. | |
| M-XV series | surfaced: 283 submerged: 353 | 49.5 | | ORP Mazur | 25 September 1954 | 1965 | Former Soviet vessel. | |
| M-XV series | surfaced: 283 submerged: 353 | 49.5 | | ORP Krakowiak | 18 October 1954 | early 1960s | Former Soviet vessel. | |
| M-XV series | surfaced: 283 submerged: 353 | 49.5 | | ORP Ślązak | 18 October 1954 | early 1960s | Former Soviet vessel. | |
| M-XV series | surfaced: 283 submerged: 353 | 49.5 | | ORP Kujawiak | 27 May 1955 | 1966 | Former Soviet vessel. | |
| M-XV series | surfaced: 283 submerged: 353 | 49.5 | | ORP Kurp | 27 May 1955 | early 1960s | Former Soviet vessel. | |
| Project 613 | surfaced: 1100 submerged: 1650 | 76.0 | | ORP Orzeł | 29 November 1962 | 31 December 1983 | Scrapped in 1986. Former Soviet vessel, which served in the Soviet Navy as S-265. | |
| Project 613 | surfaced: 1100 submerged: 1650 | 76.0 | | ORP Sokół | October 1964 | 12 December 1987 | Former Soviet vessel, which served in the Soviet Navy as S-278. | |
| Project 613 | surfaced: 1100 submerged: 1650 | 76.0 | | ORP Kondor | 10 June 1965 | 30 October 1985 | Former Soviet vessel, which served in the Soviet Navy as S-355. | |
| Project 613 | surfaced: 1100 submerged: 1650 | 76.0 | | ORP Bielik | 1 July 1965 | 29 September 1988 | Former Soviet vessel, which served in the Soviet Navy as S-279. | |
| Project 641 | surfaced: 2207 submerged: 2484 | 91.3 | | ORP Wilk | 3 November 1987 | 10 October 2003 | Both vessels were scrapped in Gdańsk in 2005. Former Soviet vessel B-98, in Soviet service from 1963. | |
| Project 641 | surfaced: 2207 submerged: 2484 | 91.3 | | ORP Dzik | 7 December 1988 | 7 November 2003 | Both vessels were scrapped in Gdańsk in 2005. Former Soviet vessel B-441, launched in 1966. | |
| Type 207 | surfaced: 459 submerged: 524 | 47.4 | | ORP Sokół | 4 June 2002 | 8 June 2018 | Preserved as a museum ship. Former Norwegian vessel, which served in the Royal Norwegian Navy as KNM Stord (S-308) from 1967 to 2001. Launched in 1966. | |
| Type 207 | surfaced: 459 submerged: 524 | 47.4 | | ORP Kondor | 20 October 2004 | 20 December 2017 | Transferred to the Military Property Agency in 2021. Former Norwegian vessel, which served in the Royal Norwegian Navy as KNM Kunna (S-319) from 1964 to 2001. | |
| Type 207 | surfaced: 459 submerged: 524 | 47.4 | | ORP Sęp | 16 August 2002 | 14 December 2021 | Former Norwegian vessel, which served in the Royal Norwegian Navy as KNM Skolpen (S-306) from 1966 to 2001. Launched in 1966. | |
| Type 207 | surfaced: 459 submerged: 524 | 47.4 | | ORP Bielik | 8 September 2003 | 14 December 2021 | Former Norwegian vessel, which served in the Royal Norwegian Navy as KNM Svenner (S-309) from 1967 to 2001. Launched in 1966. | |

=== Cruisers ===
| Class / project | Displacement (tonnes) | Length (m) | Image | Ship | Commissioned | Decommissioned | Notes |
|---|---|---|---|---|---|---|---|
| D class | standard: 4,276 full load: 5,603 | 146.5 | | ORP Dragon | 15 January 1943 | 16 July 1944 | Former HMS Dragon; damaged by a German Neger human torpedo and scuttled as part of the Mulberry harbour breakwater off Sword Beach. |
| D class | standard: 4,276 full load: 5,603 | 146.5 | | ORP Conrad | 4 October 1944 | 28 September 1946 | Former HMS Danae; returned to the Royal Navy in 1946. |

=== Destroyers ===
==== Decommissioned by 1946 ====
| Class / project | Displacement (tonnes) | Length (m) | Image | Ship | Commissioned | Decommissioned | Notes |
|---|---|---|---|---|---|---|---|
| Wicher class | standard: 1,400 full load: 1,910 | 106.9 | | ORP Wicher | 8 July 1930 | 3 September 1939 | Sunk by German aircraft on 3 September 1939. |
| Grom class | standard: 2,011 normal: 2,138 | 114.0 | | ORP Grom | 28 May 1937 | 4 May 1940 | Sunk by a German aircraft in Rombaksfjord near Narvik. |
| G class | standard: 1,335 full load: 1,854 | 98.5 | | ORP Garland | 3 May 1940 | 24 September 1946 | Former HMS Garland; returned to the Royal Navy and later sold to the Royal Netherlands Navy as HNLMS Marnix. |
| Bourrasque class | standard: 1,319 full load: 1,727 | 105.8 | | OF Ouragan | 18 July 1940 | 30 April 1941 | Loaned to the Polish Navy and returned to the French Navy in 1941. |
| N class | standard: 1,773 full load: 2,384 | 108.69 | | ORP Piorun | 5 November 1940 | 28 September 1946 | Transferred to replace ORP Grom; returned to the Royal Navy and served as HMS Noble. |
| Hunt II class | standard: 1,050 full load: 1,490 | 85.3 | | ORP Krakowiak | 28 May 1941 | 28 September 1946 | Built as HMS Silverton and returned to the Royal Navy under that name. |
| Hunt II class | standard: 1,050 full load: 1,490 | 85.3 | | ORP Kujawiak | 30 May 1941 | 16 June 1942 | Built as HMS Oakley; sunk by a mine off Valletta, Malta. |
| Hunt II class | standard: 1,050 full load: 1,490 | 85.3 | | ORP Ślązak | 30 April 1942 | 28 September 1946 | Built as HMS Bedale; returned to Britain and later transferred to India as INS Godavari. |
| M class | standard: 1,920 full load: 2,661 | 110.5 | | ORP Orkan | 18 November 1942 | 8 October 1943 | Built as HMS Myrmidon; sunk by an acoustic torpedo fired by German submarine U-378. |

==== Conventional destroyers decommissioned after 1947 ====
| Class / project | Displacement (tonnes) | Length (m) | Image | Ship | Commissioned | Decommissioned | Notes | References |
|---|---|---|---|---|---|---|---|---|
| Wicher class | standard: 1540 full load: 1910/2010 | 106.9 | | ORP Burza | 10 August 1932 | 24 February 1960 (active service) | Museum ship from 1960. Struck from the naval register on 31 December 1976 and subsequently scrapped. | |
| Grom class | standard: 2011 normal: 2144 | 114.0 | | ORP Błyskawica | 25 November 1937 | 1 January 1975 (active service) | Museum ship, retained on the naval register. | |
| Project 30bis | standard: 2240 full load: 3181 | 120.5 | | ORP Grom | 15 December 1957 | 1972 | Sunk as part of a breakwater near Hel. Served in the Soviet Navy as Sposobnyy from 1952 to 1957. | |
| Project 30bis | standard: 2240 full load: 3181 | 120.5 | | ORP Wicher | 29 June 1958 | 1974 | Sunk as part of a breakwater near Hel. Served in the Soviet Navy as Skoryy from 1951 to 1958. | |

==== Guided-missile destroyers ====
| Class / project | Displacement (tonnes) | Length (m) | Image | Ship | Commissioned | Decommissioned | Notes | References |
|---|---|---|---|---|---|---|---|---|
| Project 56AE | standard: 2850 full load: 3600 | 127.5 | | ORP Warszawa | 3 June 1970 | 31 January 1986 | Scrapped at Świnoujście in 1987. Served in the Soviet Navy as Spravedlivyy from 1956 to 1970 and was purchased by Poland in 1969. | |
| Project 61 | standard: 3850 full load: 4950 | 146.2 | | ORP Warszawa | 9 January 1988 | 5 December 2003 | Sold for scrap in 2005. On 29 August 2005 the ship was towed to Gdańsk and broken up at the former Gdańsk Shipyard. It served in the Soviet Navy as Smelyy from 1969 to 1987. Poland leased the ship from the Soviet Union in 1987 for seven years; after the lease expired, Russia transferred ownership to the Polish Navy. | |

=== Corvettes ===
| Class / project | Displacement (tonnes) | Length (m) | Image | Ship | Commissioned | Decommissioned | Notes | References |
|---|---|---|---|---|---|---|---|---|
| Project 1241RE | full load: 455 | 56.90 | | ORP Górnik | 28 December 1983 | 31 May 2005 | Scrapped in 2011. | |
| Project 1241RE | full load: 455 | 56.90 | | ORP Hutnik | 31 March 1984 | 31 May 2005 | | |
| Project 1241RE | full load: 455 | 56.90 | | ORP Metalowiec | 13 January 1988 | 3 December 2013 | Sold in 2018 and scrapped in 2020. | |
| Project 1241RE | full load: 455 | 56.90 | | ORP Rolnik | 4 February 1989 | 3 December 2013 | Sold in 2018 and scrapped in 2020. | |

=== Missile boats ===
| Class / project | Displacement (tonnes) | Length (m) | Image | Ship | Commissioned | Decommissioned | Notes | References |
|---|---|---|---|---|---|---|---|---|
| Project 205 | standard: 172 full load: 210 | 38.6 | | ORP Hel | 14 January 1964 | 31 December 1984 | | |
| Project 205 | standard: 172 full load: 210 | 38.6 | | ORP Gdańsk | 9 September 1964 | 28 February 1989 | | |
| Project 205 | standard: 172 full load: 210 | 38.6 | | ORP Gdynia | 7 September 1965 | 15 November 1989 | After conversion, served with the Maritime Unit of the Polish Border Guard as patrol vessel SG-301 from 1991 to 1995. | |
| Project 205 | standard: 172 full load: 210 | 38.6 | | ORP Kołobrzeg | 12 November 1965 | 15 June 1993 | | |
| Project 205 | standard: 172 full load: 210 | 38.6 | | ORP Szczecin | 17 January 1966 | 30 June 1990 | After conversion, served with the Maritime Unit of the Polish Border Guard as patrol vessel SG-302 from 1991 to 1995. | |
| Project 205 | standard: 172 full load: 210 | 38.6 | | ORP Elbląg | 14 September 1966 | 30 June 1990 | After conversion, served with the Maritime Unit of the Polish Border Guard as patrol vessel SG-303 from 1991 to 1995. | |
| Project 205 | standard: 172 full load: 210 | 38.6 | | ORP Puck | 30 October 1967 | 7 February 2003 | | |
| Project 205 | standard: 172 full load: 210 | 38.6 | | ORP Ustka | 30 September 1968 | 2 October 2000 | | |
| Project 205 | standard: 172 full load: 210 | 38.6 | | ORP Oksywie | 10 December 1971 | 2 October 2000 | | |
| Project 205 | standard: 172 full load: 210 | 38.6 | | ORP Darłowo | 20 January 1972 | 7 February 2003 | | |
| Project 205 | standard: 172 full load: 210 | 38.6 | | ORP Świnoujście | 13 January 1973 | 31 March 2006 | | |
| Project 205 | standard: 172 full load: 210 | 38.6 | | ORP Dziwnów | 27 January 1975 | 17 June 2004 | | |
| Project 205 | standard: 172 full load: 210 | 38.6 | | ORP Władysławowo | 13 November 1975 | 31 March 2006 | A museum ship at the open-air maritime museum in Kołobrzeg. | |

=== Torpedo boats ===
| Class / project | Displacement (tonnes) | Length (m) | Image | Ship | Commissioned | Decommissioned | Notes |
|---|---|---|---|---|---|---|---|
| A 56 type | standard: 330 full load: 381 | 61.1 | | ORP Krakowiak | 17 September 1921 | 27 October 1936 | Former German torpedo boat A64. |
| A 56 type | standard: 330 full load: 381 | 61.1 | | ORP Ślązak | 15 October 1921 | 1938 | Former German torpedo boat A59; later used as an unarmed aircraft target ship. |
| A 56 type | standard: 330 full load: 381 | 61.1 | | ORP Kujawiak | 17 September 1921 | 6 April 1939 | Former German torpedo boat A68; later used as a machinery-training and gunnery-training ship and as a floating oil tank. |
| A 56 type | standard: 330 full load: 381 | 61.1 | | ORP Podhalanin | 1924 | 12 April 1938 | Former German torpedo boat A80; later used as a floating tanker. |
| V 105 type | standard: 340 full load: 421 | 62.6 | | ORP Kaszub | 17 September 1921 | 22 October 1925 | Former German torpedo boat V108; sank after a boiler explosion on 20 July 1925. |
| V 105 type | standard: 340 full load: 421 | 62.6 | | ORP Mazur | 2 August 1922 | 1 September 1939 | Former German torpedo boat V105; later a gunnery-training ship and sunk by German aircraft. |

=== Motor torpedo boats ===
==== Decommissioned by 1946 ====
| Displacement (tonnes) | Length (m) | Image | Ship | Commissioned | Decommissioned | Notes |
|---|---|---|---|---|---|---|
| standard: 40 full load: 50 | 21.87 | | ORP S-4 | 5 July 1943 | 18 April 1944 | Transferred by the Royal Navy and later returned. |
| standard: 39 full load: 46.7 | 22.3 | | ORP S-5 | 3 May 1944 | 15 October 1945 | Transferred by the Royal Navy and later returned. |
| standard: 39 full load: 46.7 | 22.3 | | ORP S-6 | 10 July 1944 | 11 October 1945 | Transferred by the Royal Navy and later returned. |
| standard: 39 full load: 46.7 | 22.3 | | ORP S-7 | 30 July 1944 | 15 October 1945 | Transferred by the Royal Navy and later returned. |
| standard: 39 full load: 46.7 | 22.3 | | ORP S-8 | 19 September 1944 | 15 October 1945 | Transferred by the Royal Navy and later returned. |
| standard: 39 full load: 46.7 | 22.3 | | ORP S-9 | 26 October 1944 | 15 October 1945 | Transferred by the Royal Navy and later returned. |
| standard: 39 full load: 46.7 | 22.3 | | ORP S-10 | 31 October 1944 | 15 October 1945 | Transferred by the Royal Navy and later returned. |

==== Decommissioned after 1947 ====
| Class / project | Displacement (tonnes) | Length (m) | Image | Ship | Commissioned | Decommissioned | Notes | References |
|---|---|---|---|---|---|---|---|---|
| Project D-3 | standard: 32 full load: 35 | 22.6 | | Tp-1 | 5 April 1946 | 31 August 1963 | Former Soviet vessel, which served as TK-76 from 1943 to 1946. During Polish service it successively carried the designations ST-81 (from June 1952), KT-81 (from 1955) and 801 (from January 1960). | |
| Project D-3 | standard: 32 full load: 35 | 22.6 | | Tp-2 | 5 April 1946 | 31 August 1963 | Former Soviet vessel, which served as TK-116 from 1943 to 1946. During Polish service it successively carried the designations ST-82 (from June 1952), KT-82 (from 1955) and 802 (from January 1960). | |
| Project 183 | standard: 56 full load: 67 | 25.5 | | KT-71 | 11 October 1958 | 10 October 1972 | | |
| Project 183 | standard: 56 full load: 67 | 25.5 | | KT-72 | 11 October 1958 | 15 July 1970 | | |
| Project 183 | standard: 56 full load: 67 | 25.5 | | KT-73 | 11 October 1958 | 1 January 1971 | | |
| Project 183 | standard: 56 full load: 67 | 25.5 | | KT-74 | 11 October 1958 | 10 October 1972 | Later target boat KS-2; withdrawn on 31 December 1979. | |
| Project 183 | standard: 56 full load: 67 | 25.5 | | KT-75 | 11 October 1958 | 15 July 1970 | | |
| Project 183 | standard: 56 full load: 67 | 25.5 | | KT-76 | 11 October 1958 | 31 December 1967 | Later target boat KS-1; withdrawn on 31 December 1985. | |
| Project 183 | standard: 56 full load: 67 | 25.5 | | KT-77 | 11 October 1958 | 15 July 1970 | | |
| Project 183 | standard: 56 full load: 67 | 25.5 | | KT-78 | 11 October 1958 | 25 October 1973 | | |
| Project 183 | standard: 56 full load: 67 | 25.5 | | KT-79 | 11 October 1958 | 31 December 1967 | | |
| Project 183 | standard: 56 full load: 67 | 25.5 | | KT-83 | 24 November 1956 | 25 October 1973 | | |
| Project 183 | standard: 56 full load: 67 | 25.5 | | KT-84 | 24 November 1956 | 25 October 1973 | Preserved ashore at the Polish Naval Training Centre. | |
| Project 183 | standard: 56 full load: 67 | 25.5 | | KT-85 | 24 November 1956 | 25 October 1973 | | |
| Project 183 | standard: 56 full load: 67 | 25.5 | | KT-86 | 24 November 1956 | 25 October 1973 | | |
| Project 183 | standard: 56 full load: 67 | 25.5 | | KT-87 | 24 November 1956 | 31 December 1971 | | |
| Project 183 | standard: 56 full load: 67 | 25.5 | | KT-88 | 25 June 1957 | 25 October 1973 | Later target boat KS-3; withdrawn on 31 December 1980. | |
| Project 183 | standard: 56 full load: 67 | 25.5 | | KT-89 | 25 June 1957 | 25 October 1973 | | |
| Project 183 | standard: 56 full load: 67 | 25.5 | | KT-90 | 25 June 1957 | 25 October 1973 | | |
| Project 183 | standard: 56 full load: 67 | 25.5 | | KT-91 | 11 October 1958 | 1 January 1971 | | |
| Project 183 | standard: 56 full load: 67 | 25.5 | | KT-92 | 11 October 1958 | 15 July 1970 | | |
| Project 663D | standard: 94 full load: 128.1 | 24.76 | Bliźniaczy ORP Sprawny | ORP Błyskawiczny | 3 November 1965 | 31 December 1979 | Experimental vessel and prototype for the Project 664 torpedo boats. | |
| Project 664 | standard: 94 full load: 128.1 | 24.76 | | ORP Bitny | 20 January 1972 | 31 January 1986 | | |
| Project 664 | standard: 94 full load: 128.1 | 24.76 | | ORP Bystry | 20 January 1972 | 31 December 1983 | | |
| Project 664 | standard: 94 full load: 128.1 | 24.76 | | ORP Dzielny | 22 July 1972 | 31 December 1981 | | |
| Project 664 | standard: 94 full load: 128.1 | 24.76 | | ORP Dziarski | 20 October 1972 | 31 December 1984 | | |
| Project 664 | standard: 94 full load: 128.1 | 24.76 | | ORP Sprawny | 13 January 1973 | 15 November 1986 | | |
| Project 664 | standard: 94 full load: 128.1 | 24.76 | | ORP Szybki | 28 April 1973 | 31 August 1984 | | |
| Project 664 | standard: 94 full load: 128.1 | 24.76 | | ORP Odważny | 15 September 1973 | 31 January 1986 | Preserved at the White Eagle Museum in Skarżysko-Kamienna (formerly the General Zygmunt Berling Regional Museum). | |
| Project 664 | standard: 94 full load: 128.1 | 24.76 | | ORP Odporny | 17 November 1973 | 15 November 1986 | | |

=== Motor gun boats ===
| Displacement (tonnes) | Length (m) | Image | Ship | Commissioned | Decommissioned | Notes |
|---|---|---|---|---|---|---|
| standard: 35 full load: 38.5 | 22.86 | | ORP S-1 | 15 October 1940 | 21 February 1944 | Ordered before the war from J. Samuel White; withdrawn because of wear. |
| standard: 24 full load: 31 | 19.2 | | ORP S-2 | 19 July 1940 | 5 July 1944 | Taken over in 1940 and withdrawn because of wear. |
| standard: 24 full load: 31 | 19.2 | | ORP S-3 | 28 July 1940 | 20 May 1943 | Taken over in 1940 and withdrawn because of wear. |

=== Gunboats ===
| Class / project | Displacement (tonnes) | Length (m) | Image | Ship | Commissioned | Decommissioned | Notes |
|---|---|---|---|---|---|---|---|
| Vodoriez type | standard: 350 full load: 438 | 50.04 | | ORP Generał Haller | 17 April 1921 | 6 September 1939 | Built in Finland for the Imperial Russian Navy; sunk by German aircraft at Hel. |
| Vodoriez type | standard: 350 full load: 438 | 50.04 | | ORP Komendant Piłsudski | 29 December 1920 | 1939 | Probably scuttled at Hel, repaired by Germany and sunk in an air raid at Nantes in 1943. |

=== Submarine chasers ===
==== Decommissioned by 1946 ====
| Displacement (tonnes) | Length (m) | Image | Ship | Commissioned | Decommissioned | Notes |
|---|---|---|---|---|---|---|
| 137 | 37.1 | | OF Ch 11 | 19 July 1940 | 5 February 1941 | Taken over by Britain after the fall of France, crewed by Poles and returned to the French Navy. |
| 137 | 37.1 | | OF Ch 15 | 19 July 1940 | 5 February 1941 | Taken over by Britain after the fall of France, crewed by Poles and returned to the French Navy. |

==== Decommissioned after 1947 ====
| Class / project | Displacement (tonnes) | Length (m) | Image | Ship | Commissioned | Decommissioned | Notes | References |
|---|---|---|---|---|---|---|---|---|
| Project 194 (BMO) | standard: 62 full load: 73.8 | 24.7 | | ORP Błyskawiczny | 5 April 1946 | 15 April 1960 | Former Soviet vessel, which served as MO-546 from 1944 to 1946. | |
| OD-200 | standard: 35 full load: 43.4 | 23.4 | | ORP Bezwzględny | 5 April 1946 | 25 January 1959 | | |
| OD-200 | standard: 35 full load: 43.4 | 23.4 | | ORP Bystry | 5 April 1946 | 25 January 1959 | | |
| OD-200 | standard: 35 full load: 43.4 | 23.4 | | ORP Dziarski | 5 April 1946 | 15 April 1960 | | |
| OD-200 | standard: 35 full load: 43.4 | 23.4 | | ORP Dzielny | 5 April 1946 | 1959 | | |
| OD-200 | standard: 35 full load: 43.4 | 23.4 | | ORP Karny | 5 April 1946 | 15 April 1960 | | |
| OD-200 | standard: 35 full load: 43.4 | 23.4 | | ORP Niedościgły | 5 April 1946 | 15 April 1960 | | |
| OD-200 | standard: 35 full load: 43.4 | 23.4 | | ORP Nieuchwytny | 5 April 1946 | 25 January 1959 | | |
| OD-200 | standard: 35 full load: 43.4 | 23.4 | | ORP Odważny | 5 April 1946 | 15 April 1960 | | |
| OD-200 | standard: 35 full load: 43.4 | 23.4 | | ORP Śmiały | 5 April 1946 | 15 April 1960 | | |
| OD-200 | standard: 35 full load: 43.4 | 23.4 | | ORP Sprawny | 5 April 1946 | 15 April 1960 | | |
| OD-200 | standard: 35 full load: 43.4 | 23.4 | | ORP Szybki | 5 April 1946 | 15 April 1960 | | |
| Project 122bis | standard: 302 full load: 336 | 52.2 | | ORP Czujny | 27 May 1955 | 10 October 1972 | Former Soviet vessel DS-41. | |
| Project 122bis | standard: 302 full load: 336 | 52.2 | | ORP Nieugięty | 27 May 1955 | 10 October 1972 | Former Soviet vessel DS-42. | |
| Project 122bis | standard: 302 full load: 336 | 52.2 | | ORP Zawzięty | 27 May 1955 | 31 December 1971 | Former Soviet vessel DS-43. | |
| Project 122bis | standard: 302 full load: 336 | 52.2 | | ORP Zwrotny | 27 May 1955 | 15 November 1971 | Former Soviet vessel DS-44. | |
| Project 122bis | standard: 302 full load: 336 | 52.2 | | ORP Zwinny | 15 December 1957 | 1 January 1971 | Former Soviet vessel DS-45. | |
| Project 122bis | standard: 302 full load: 336 | 52.2 | | ORP Zręczny | 15 December 1957 | 1 January 1971 | Former Soviet vessel DS-46. | |
| Project 122bis | standard: 302 full load: 336 | 52.2 | | ORP Wytrwały | 15 December 1957 | 15 July 1970 | Former Soviet vessel DS-47. | |
| Project 122bis | standard: 302 full load: 336 | 52.2 | | ORP Groźny | 15 December 1957 | 15 July 1970 | Former Soviet vessel DS-48. | |
| Project 912M | standard: 212 full load: 235 | 41.26 | | ORP Groźny | 8 February 1970 | 6 July 2004 | | |
| Project 912M | standard: 212 full load: 235 | 41.26 | | ORP Wytrwały | 8 February 1970 | 6 July 2004 | | |
| Project 912M | standard: 212 full load: 235 | 41.26 | | ORP Zręczny | 30 December 1970 | 6 July 2004 | | |
| Project 912M | standard: 212 full load: 235 | 41.26 | | ORP Zwinny | 30 December 1970 | 6 July 2004 | | |
| Project 912M | standard: 212 full load: 235 | 41.26 | | ORP Zwrotny | 4 July 1971 | 10 October 2003 | | |
| Project 912M | standard: 212 full load: 235 | 41.26 | | ORP Zawzięty | 10 October 1971 | 6 July 2004 | | |
| Project 912M | standard: 212 full load: 235 | 41.26 | | ORP Nieugięty | 7 July 1972 | 10 October 2003 | | |
| Project 912M | standard: 212 full load: 235 | 41.26 | | ORP Czujny | 30 September 1972 | 6 July 2004 | | |

=== Patrol vessels ===
| Displacement (tonnes) | Length (m) | Image | Ship | Commissioned | Decommissioned | Notes |
|---|---|---|---|---|---|---|
| unknown | 72.3 | | OF Médoc | 18 July 1940 | 21 October 1940 | Auxiliary patrol vessel taken over by Britain after the fall of France, crewed by Poles and returned because of poor condition. |
| unknown | 72.3 | | OF Pomerol | 18 July 1940 | 8 January 1941 | Auxiliary patrol vessel taken over by Britain after the fall of France, crewed by Poles and returned because of poor condition. |

=== Anti-submarine warfare boats ===
| Class / project | Displacement (tonnes) | Length (m) | Image | Ship | Commissioned | Decommissioned | Notes | References |
|---|---|---|---|---|---|---|---|---|
| Project 918M | standard: 86.88 full load: 93.03 | 28.85 | | ORP KP-166 | 23 April 1977 | May 2005 | | |
| Project 918M | standard: 86.88 full load: 93.03 | 28.85 | | ORP KP-167 | 28 January 1978 | 31 March 2006 | | |
| Project 918M | standard: 86.88 full load: 93.03 | 28.85 | | ORP KP-168 | 28 January 1978 | 31 March 2006 | | |
| Project 918M | standard: 86.88 full load: 93.03 | 28.85 | | ORP KP-169 | 10 February 1979 | 23 March 2005 | | |
| Project 918M | standard: 86.88 full load: 93.03 | 28.85 | | ORP KP-170 | 7 August 1980 | May 2005 | | |
| Project 918M | standard: 86.88 full load: 93.03 | 28.85 | | ORP KP-171 | 8 January 1982 | 31 March 2006 | | |
| Project 918M | standard: 86.88 full load: 93.03 | 28.85 | | ORP KP-172 | 7 May 1982 | May 2005 | In civilian ownership as Czsz-172, operating tourist cruises in the roadstead of the Port of Kołobrzeg. | |
| Project 918M | standard: 86.88 full load: 93.03 | 28.85 | | ORP KP-173 | 22 July 1982 | 23 March 2005 | | |
| Project 918M | standard: 86.88 full load: 93.03 | 28.85 | | ORP KP-174 | 22 September 1982 | 31 March 2006 | | |
| Project 918M | standard: 86.88 full load: 93.03 | 28.85 | | ORP KP-175 | 7 January 1983 | 23 March 2005 | | |
| Project 918M | standard: 86.88 full load: 93.03 | 28.85 | | ORP KP-176 | 24 February 1983 | May 2005 | | |

=== Minelayers ===
| Displacement (tonnes) | Length (m) | Image | Ship | Commissioned | Decommissioned | Notes |
|---|---|---|---|---|---|---|
| standard: 2,227 | 103.2 | | ORP Gryf | 27 February 1938 | 3 September 1939 | Bombed and sunk by German aircraft at Hel after an artillery engagement with German destroyers. |

=== Minehunters ===
| Class / project | Displacement (tonnes) | Length (m) | Image | Ship | Commissioned | Decommissioned | Notes | References |
|---|---|---|---|---|---|---|---|---|
| Project 206FM | standard: 426 full load: 470 | 58.2 | | ORP Flaming | 27 September 1966 | 4 December 2020 | Served as a Project 206F minesweeper from 1966 to 2000 and was converted into a Project 206FM minehunter in 2000–2001. | |
| Project 206FM | standard: 426 full load: 470 | 58.2 | | ORP Mewa | 21 May 1967 | 30 December 2019 | Served as a Project 206F minesweeper from 1967 to 1998 and was converted into a Project 206FM minehunter in 1998–1999. | |
| Project 206FM | standard: 426 full load: 470 | 58.2 | | ORP Czajka | 23 June 1967 | 8 December 2021 | Served as a Project 206F minesweeper from 1967 to 1998 and was converted into a Project 206FM minehunter in 1998–2000. | |

=== Minesweepers ===
==== Decommissioned by 1946 ====
| Class / project | Displacement (tonnes) | Length (m) | Image | Ship | Commissioned | Decommissioned | Notes |
|---|---|---|---|---|---|---|---|
| FM type | full load: 193 | 43.0 | | ORP Czajka | 1 March 1921 | 12 October 1931 | Former German minesweeper FM 28. |
| FM type | full load: 193 | 43.0 | | ORP Rybitwa | 1 March 1921 | 12 October 1931 | Former German minesweeper FM 2. |
| FM type | full load: 193 | 43.0 | | ORP Jaskółka | 1 March 1921 | 12 October 1931 | Former German minesweeper FM 27. |
| FM type | full load: 193 | 43.0 | | ORP Mewa | 1 March 1921 | 14 September 1939 | Former German minesweeper FM 31; converted into the hydrographic ship ORP Pomorzanin and sunk in 1939. |
| Jaskółka class | standard: 183 full load: 203 | 45.0 | | ORP Jaskółka | 27 August 1935 | 14 September 1939 | Sunk by the Luftwaffe. |
| Jaskółka class | standard: 183 full load: 203 | 45.0 | | ORP Czapla | 31 August 1939 | 14 September 1939 | Entered the September Campaign before completion and was sunk by German aircraft. |

==== Fleet minesweepers decommissioned after 1947 ====
| Class / project | Displacement (tonnes) | Length (m) | Image | Ship | Commissioned | Decommissioned | Notes | References |
|---|---|---|---|---|---|---|---|---|
| Jaskółka class | standard: 183 full load: 203 | 45.0 | | ORP Mewa | 25 October 1935 | 1970 | Served in the Kriegsmarine during the Second World War. Later transferred to the Border Protection Troops and operated as BK-2. Scrapped in 1981. | |
| Jaskółka class | standard: 183 full load: 203 | 45.0 | | ORP Rybitwa | 21 December 1935 | 1966 | Served in the Kriegsmarine during the Second World War. Later transferred to the Border Protection Troops and operated as BK-2. Scrapped after 1972. | |
| Jaskółka class | standard: 183 full load: 203 | 45.0 | | ORP Czajka | 10 February 1936 | 1966 | Served in the Kriegsmarine during the Second World War. Scrapped in 1977. | |
| Jaskółka class | standard: 183 full load: 203 | 45.0 | | ORP Żuraw | 31 August 1939 | 15 October 1971 | Commissioned in 1939 as ORP Żuraw. Served in the Kriegsmarine during the Second World War. Renamed Kompas and used as a hydrographic survey ship from 1951 to 1971, then served with the Border Protection Troops as BK-4 from 1971 to 1981. | |
| Project 253L (MT class) | standard: 128 full load: 143 | 38.0 | | ORP Kondor | 5 April 1946 | December 1957 | | |
| Project 253L (MT class) | standard: 128 full load: 143 | 38.0 | | ORP Krogulec | 5 April 1946 | 1958 | | |
| Project 253L (MT class) | standard: 128 full load: 143 | 38.0 | | ORP Kormoran | 5 April 1946 | 25 January 1959 | | |
| Project 253L (MT class) | standard: 128 full load: 143 | 38.0 | | ORP Kania | 5 April 1946 | 25 January 1959 | | |
| Project 253L (MT class) | standard: 128 full load: 143 | 38.0 | | ORP Albatros | 5 April 1946 | 25 January 1959 | | |
| Project 253L (MT class) | standard: 128 full load: 143 | 38.0 | | ORP Czapla | 5 April 1946 | 1958 | | |
| Project 253L (MT class) | standard: 128 full load: 143 | 38.0 | | ORP Jaskółka | 5 April 1946 | 25 January 1959 | Struck from the naval register on 25 January 1959 and placed ashore as the Kur firefighting training facility at the Polish Navy Diver Training Centre in Gdynia. | |
| Project 253L (MT class) | standard: 128 full load: 143 | 38.0 | | ORP Jastrząb | 5 April 1946 | December 1957 | | |
| Project 253L (MT class) | standard: 128 full load: 143 | 38.0 | | ORP Orlik | 5 April 1946 | 25 January 1959 | | |
| YMS class | 277 | 41.9 | | ORP Delfin | 18 April 1948 | 26 June 1957 | Former British vessel BYMS-2211, in service from 1943 to 1947. Sunk in the Bay of Puck as a target ship. | |
| YMS class | 277 | 41.9 | | ORP Foka | 18 April 1948 | 12 December 1955 | Former British vessel BYMS-2257, in service from 1944 to 1947. | |
| YMS class | 277 | 41.9 | | ORP Mors | 18 April 1948 | 26 June 1957 | Former British vessel BYMS-2282, in service from 1943 to 1947. | |
| Project 254K/M | 550 | 58.0 | | ORP Żubr | 22 December 1956 | 15 March 1987 | Scrapped. | |
| Project 254K/M | 550 | 58.0 | | ORP Tur | 6 August 1957 | 31 October 1991 | During a 1978 refit at the Naval Shipyard in Gdynia, a decision was made to convert the vessel into a research ship for trials of new radar-surveillance systems. While awaiting disposal at the Gdynia-Oksywie Naval Base, it sank in a storm on 14 January 1993, after which it was raised and scrapped. | |
| Project 254K/M | 550 | 58.0 | | ORP Łoś | 17 November 1957 | 16 October 1989 | Scrapped. | |
| Project 254K/M | 550 | 58.0 | | ORP Dzik | 21 September 1958 | 18 May 1990 | Scrapped. | |
| Project 254K/M | 550 | 58.0 | | ORP Bizon | 21 September 1958 | 18 May 1990 | Scrapped. | |
| Project 254K/M | 550 | 58.0 | | ORP Bóbr | 28 June 1958 | 18 May 1990 | Scrapped. | |
| Project 254K/M | 550 | 58.0 | | ORP Rosomak | 8 November 1958 | 18 May 1990 | Scrapped. | |
| Project 254K/M | 550 | 58.0 | | ORP Delfin | 4 January 1959 | 30 November 1988 | Scrapped. | |
| Project 254K/M | 550 | 58.0 | | ORP Foka | 26 April 1959 | 15 March 1987 | Scrapped. | |
| Project 254K/M | 550 | 58.0 | | ORP Mors | 5 July 1959 | 16 October 1989 | Scrapped. | |
| Project 254K/M | 550 | 58.0 | | ORP Ryś | 10 September 1959 | 16 October 1989 | Scrapped. | |
| Project 254K/M | 550 | 58.0 | | ORP Żbik | 6 November 1959 | 16 October 1989 | Scrapped. | |
| Project 206F | standard: 426 full load: 470 | 58.2 | | ORP Orlik | 24 August 1963 | 16 October 1989 | | |
| Project 206F | standard: 426 full load: 470 | 58.2 | | ORP Krogulec | 10 November 1963 | 16 October 1989 | | |
| Project 206F | standard: 426 full load: 470 | 58.2 | | ORP Jastrząb | 4 January 1964 | 25 April 1990 | | |
| Project 206F | standard: 426 full load: 470 | 58.2 | | ORP Kormoran | 10 January 1965 | 15 June 1993 | | |
| Project 206F | standard: 426 full load: 470 | 58.2 | | ORP Czapla | 4 July 1965 | 25 April 1990 | | |
| Project 206F | standard: 426 full load: 470 | 58.2 | | ORP Albatros | 6 November 1965 | 2 December 1994 | | |
| Project 206F | standard: 426 full load: 470 | 58.2 | | ORP Pelikan | 7 June 1966 | 15 December 1993 | | |
| Project 206F | standard: 426 full load: 470 | 58.2 | | ORP Tukan | 19 August 1966 | 2 October 2000 | | |
| Project 206F | standard: 426 full load: 470 | 58.2 | | ORP Rybitwa | 15 April 1967 | 5 January 2002 | After decommissioning, the vessel was temporarily used as an accommodation hulk for the crews of the sister ships ORP Mewa, ORP Flaming and ORP Czajka, which were being converted into Project 206FM minehunters. | |
| Project 207DM (Gopło) | 225 | 38.5 | | ORP Gopło | 13 March 1982 | 13 March 2026 | | |

==== Minesweeping boats ====
| Class / project | Displacement (tonnes) | Length (m) | Image | Ship | Commissioned | Decommissioned | Notes | References |
|---|---|---|---|---|---|---|---|---|
| Project 151 | standard: 46.4 full load: 49.2 | 27.7 | | TR-41 | 3 April 1955 | 15 July 1970 | | |
| Project 151 | standard: 46.4 full load: 49.2 | 27.7 | | TR-42 | 23 October 1955 | 10 April 1971 | Renamed K-12 in 1970. | |
| Project 151 | standard: 46.4 full load: 49.2 | 27.7 | | TR-43 | 8 January 1956 | 15 July 1970 | | |
| Project 151 | standard: 46.4 full load: 49.2 | 27.7 | | TR-44 | 17 June 1956 | 31 December 1966 | | |
| Project 151 | standard: 46.4 full load: 49.2 | 27.7 | | TR-45 | 29 June 1956 | 31 December 1966 | | |
| Project 151 | standard: 46.4 full load: 49.2 | 27.7 | | TR-46 | 19 August 1956 | 15 July 1970 | | |
| Project 151 | standard: 46.4 full load: 49.2 | 27.7 | | TR-47 | 7 October 1956 | 10 April 1971 | Renamed K-13 in 1970. | |
| Project 361T | unknown | unknown | | 25 vessels numbered TR-51 to TR-62 and TR-65 to TR-75 | | | Twenty-five boats of this type served with the 14th Minesweeping Boat Squadron from 1958 to 1982. | |
| Project B410-IV/S | full load: 269 | 25.8 | | TR-25 | 12 October 1983 | 2005 | | |
| Project B410-IV/S | full load: 269 | 25.8 | | TR-26 | 12 October 1983 | 2005 | | |

=== Landing ships ===
| Class / project | Displacement (tonnes) | Length (m) | Image | Ship | Commissioned | Decommissioned | Notes | References |
|---|---|---|---|---|---|---|---|---|
| Project 770 | full load: 800 | 73.0 | | ORP Oka | 14 January 1964 | 25 April 1990 | | |
| Project 770 | full load: 800 | 73.0 | | ORP Bug | 14 January 1964 | 20 December 1989 | | |
| Project 770 | full load: 800 | 73.0 | | ORP Narew | 3 March 1964 | 25 April 1990 | In civilian ownership as Trans-Baltic from 1991. | |
| Project 770 | full load: 800 | 73.0 | | ORP San | 27 July 1964 | 25 April 1990 | | |
| Project 770 | full load: 800 | 73.0 | | ORP Wisła | 23 December 1964 | 20 January 1991 | | |
| Project 770 | full load: 800 | 73.0 | | ORP Pilica | 6 April 1965 | 20 January 1991 | | |
| Project 770 | full load: 800 | 73.0 | | ORP Bzura | 6 April 1965 | 1 August 1990 | | |
| Project 770 | full load: 800 | 73.0 | | ORP Warta | 1 June 1965 | 16 October 1989 | | |
| Project 770 | full load: 800 | 73.0 | | ORP Noteć | 1 June 1965 | 16 October 1989 | | |
| Project 770 | full load: 800 | 73.0 | | ORP Odra | 24 December 1966 | 1 September 1990 | | |
| Project 770 | full load: 800 | 73.0 | | ORP Nysa | 24 December 1966 | 1 September 1990 | In civilian ownership as Kodan from 1991. | |
| Project 771 | full load: 836 | 75.15 | | ORP Lenino | 28 January 1968 | 30 April 1991 | | |
| Project 771 | full load: 836 | 75.15 | | ORP Brda | 28 January 1968 | 30 April 1991 | | |
| Project 771 | full load: 836 | 75.15 | | ORP Studzianki | 11 January 1969 | 30 April 1991 | | |
| Project 771 | full load: 836 | 75.15 | | ORP Siekierki | 11 January 1969 | 28 May 1991 | | |
| Project 771 | full load: 836 | 75.15 | | ORP Budziszyn | 11 January 1969 | 1 June 1990 | | |
| Project 771 | full load: 836 | 75.15 | | ORP Polichno | 11 January 1969 | 31 October 1991 | | |
| Project 771 | full load: 836 | 75.15 | | ORP Janów | 11 January 1970 | 30 April 1991 | | |
| Project 771 | full load: 836 | 75.15 | | ORP Rąblów | 11 January 1970 | 30 April 1991 | | |
| Project 771 | full load: 836 | 75.15 | | ORP Narwik | 10 October 1971 | 31 October 1991 | | |
| Project 771 | full load: 836 | 75.15 | | ORP Głogów | 10 October 1971 | 30 June 1994 | | |
| Project 771 | full load: 836 | 75.15 | | ORP Cedynia | 10 October 1971 | 7 April 2001 | | |
| Project 776 | full load: 1253 | 81.3 | | ORP Grunwald | April 1973 | 2 March 2005 | | |

==== Landing craft ====
| Class / project | Displacement (tonnes) | Length (m) | Image | Ship | Commissioned | Decommissioned | Notes | References |
|---|---|---|---|---|---|---|---|---|
| MFP D | standard: 168 full load: 239 loaded: 306 | 49.8 | | ODD-1 | | 28 December 1957 | Former German vessel BDD-1. | |
| MFP D | standard: 168 full load: 239 loaded: 306 | 49.8 | | ODD-2 | | 28 December 1957 | Former German vessel BDD-2. | |
| MFP D | standard: 168 full load: 239 loaded: 306 | 49.8 | | ODD-3 | | unknown | Former German vessel BDD-3. | |
| MFP D | standard: 168 full load: 239 loaded: 306 | 49.8 | | ODD-7 | | 24 September 1963 | Former German vessel BDD-7. | |
| MFP DM | standard: 168 full load: 239 loaded: 306 | 49.8 | | ODD-5 | | 24 September 1963 | Former German vessel BDD-5. | |
| MFP DM | standard: 168 full load: 239 loaded: 306 | 49.8 | | ODD-6 | | 24 September 1963 | Former German vessel BDD-6. | |
| MZ | standard: 140 full load: 239 | 47.0 | | ODD-4 | | | Former Italian vessel BOD-4. | |
| LCT(5) | standard: 133 loaded: 311 | 38.5 | | ODS-50 | 9 April 1951 | 15 April 1960 | Former United States vessel BDS-50. | |
| LCT(5) | standard: 133 loaded: 311 | 38.5 | | ODS-51 | 18 June 1951 | 15 April 1960 | Former United States vessel BDS-51. | |
| LCT(5) | standard: 133 loaded: 311 | 38.5 | | ODS-52 | 2 August 1951 | 6 January 1959 | Former United States vessel BDS-52. | |
| LCT(5) | standard: 133 loaded: 311 | 38.5 | | ODS-53 | 10 June 1952 | 15 April 1960 (Note: According to the Landing Ship Flotilla chronicle, the ship was formally farewelled on 5 February 1961; it is unclear whether this marked its decommissioning.) | Former United States vessel BDS-53. | |
| LCT(5) | standard: 133 loaded: 311 | 38.5 | | ODS-54 | 10 June 1952 | 28 December 1957 | Former United States vessel BDS-54. | |
| LCT(5) | standard: 133 loaded: 311 | 38.5 | | ODS-55 | 10 June 1952 | 6 January 1959 | Former United States vessel BDS-55. | |
| LCT(5) | standard: 133 loaded: 311 | 38.5 | | ODS-56 | 18 May 1951 | 15 April 1960 | Former United States vessel BDS-56. | |
| LCT(5) | standard: 133 loaded: 311 | 38.5 | | ODS-57 | 23 June 1952 | 28 December 1957 | Former United States vessel BDS-57. | |
| LCT(5) | standard: 133 loaded: 311 | 38.5 | | ODS-58 | 23 June 1952 | 25 January 1960 | Former United States vessel BDS-58. | |
| LCT(5) | standard: 133 loaded: 311 | 38.5 | | ODS-59 | 3 August 1952 | 1 September 1963 | Former United States vessel BDS-59. Renamed rescue base BR-1 near the end of its Polish Navy service. | |
| LCT(5) | standard: 133 loaded: 311 | 38.5 | | ODS-60 | 3 August 1952 | 28 December 1957 | Former United States vessel BDS-60. | |
| LCM(3) | standard: 23 loaded: 51 | 15.2 | | ODM-100 | 5 October 1951 | 25 March 1964 | Former United States vessel BDM-100. | |
| LCM(3) | standard: 23 loaded: 51 | 15.2 | | ODM-101 | 5 October 1951 | 2 February 1965 | Former United States vessel BDM-101. | |
| LCM(3) | standard: 23 loaded: 51 | 15.2 | | ODM-102 | 5 October 1951 | 25 March 1964 | Former United States vessel BDM-102. | |
| LCP(L) | standard: 6.5 loaded: 10.7 | 11.2 | | KD-19 | 13 April 1948 | 31 August 1963 | Former United States vessel. | |
| LCP(L) | standard: 6.5 loaded: 10.7 | 11.2 | | KD-28 | 13 April 1948 | 31 August 1963 | Former United States vessel. | |
| LCP(L) | standard: 6.5 loaded: 10.7 | 11.2 | | KD-37 | 13 April 1948 | 1 July 1962 | Former United States vessel. | |
| LCP(L) | standard: 6.5 loaded: 10.7 | 11.2 | | KD-46 | 13 April 1948 | 31 August 1963 | Former United States vessel. | |
| LCP(L) | standard: 6.5 loaded: 10.7 | 11.2 | | KD-55 | 13 April 1948 | 31 August 1963 | Former United States vessel. | |
| LCP(L) | standard: 6.5 loaded: 10.7 | 11.2 | | KD-64 | 13 April 1948 | 1 July 1962 | Former United States vessel. | |
| Project 709/709M | full load: 28.0 (after modernisation 29.5) | 16.46 | | KD-22 | 1 November 1962 | 15 December 1987 | | |
| Project 709/709M | full load: 28.0 (after modernisation 29.5) | 16.46 | | KD-25 | 11 June 1963 | 30 November 1988 | | |
| Project 709/709M | full load: 28.0 (after modernisation 29.5) | 16.46 | | KD-31 | 3 February 1964 | 30 November 1988 | | |
| Project 709/709M | full load: 28.0 (after modernisation 29.5) | 16.46 | | KD-34 | 3 February 1964 | 16 October 1989 | | |
| Project 709/709M | full load: 28.0 (after modernisation 29.5) | 16.46 | | KD-37 | 12 February 1964 | 16 October 1989 | | |
| Project 709/709M | full load: 28.0 (after modernisation 29.5) | 16.46 | | KD-40 | 29 April 1964 | 1 June 1990 | | |
| Project 709/709M | full load: 28.0 (after modernisation 29.5) | 16.46 | | KD-19 | 29 April 1964 | 16 October 1989 | | |
| Project 709/709M | full load: 28.0 (after modernisation 29.5) | 16.46 | | KD-43 | 29 April 1964 | 16 October 1989 | | |
| Project 709/709M | full load: 28.0 (after modernisation 29.5) | 16.46 | | KD-58 | 7 June 1964 | 1 June 1990 | | |
| Project 709/709M | full load: 28.0 (after modernisation 29.5) | 16.46 | | KD-46 | 17 July 1964 | 1 June 1990 | | |
| Project 709/709M | full load: 28.0 (after modernisation 29.5) | 16.46 | | KD-49 | 27 July 1964 | 1 June 1990 | | |
| Project 709/709M | full load: 28.0 (after modernisation 29.5) | 16.46 | | KD-52 | 17 October 1964 | 1 June 1990 | | |
| Project 709/709M | full load: 28.0 (after modernisation 29.5) | 16.46 | | KD-55 | 18 December 1964 | 1 June 1990 | | |
| Project 709/709M | full load: 28.0 (after modernisation 29.5) | 16.46 | | KD-28 | 4 February 1965 | 1 June 1990 | | |
| Project 709/709M | full load: 28.0 (after modernisation 29.5) | 16.46 | | KD-61 | 4 February 1965 | 16 August 1989 | | |
| Project 719 | full load: 28.8 | 19.7 | | KD-64 | 9 March 1975 | 31 August 1984 | Experimental vessels built of plastic. | |
| Project 719 | full load: 28.8 | 19.7 | | KD-67 | 9 March 1975 | 31 August 1984 | Experimental vessels built of plastic. | |
| Project 719 | full load: 28.8 | 19.7 | | KD-70 | 9 March 1975 | 31 August 1984 | Experimental vessels built of plastic. | |

=== Hydrographic survey ships ===
==== Decommissioned by 1946 ====
| Displacement (tonnes) | Length (m) | Image | Ship | Commissioned | Decommissioned | Notes |
|---|---|---|---|---|---|---|
| 220 | 36.0 | | ORP Pomorzanin | 1 May 1920 | 25 February 1922 | Former German passenger vessel Deutschland; the first Polish Navy ship on the Baltic Sea. |

==== Decommissioned after 1947 ====
| Class / project | Displacement (tonnes) | Length (m) | Image | Ship | Commissioned | Decommissioned | Notes | References |
|---|---|---|---|---|---|---|---|---|
| built on a B-10 fishing trawler hull | 1186 | 69.3 | | ORP Bałtyk | 7 November 1954 | 6 December 1982 | Converted into an intelligence-gathering ship in 1969. | |
| Project 861 (Moma class) | 1540 | 73.3 | | ORP Kopernik | 20 February 1971 | 20 May 2006 | Currently moored at Gdańsk-Westerplatte and used as a special-forces training facility. | |

=== Training ships ===
==== Decommissioned by 1946 ====
| Displacement (tonnes) | Length (m) | Image | Ship | Commissioned | Decommissioned | Notes |
|---|---|---|---|---|---|---|
| 7,995 | 130 | | ORP Bałtyk | 30 July 1927 | 19 September 1939 | Acquired as a training hulk; seized by Germany and scrapped by 1942. |
| 8,400 | 107.9 | | ORP Wilia | 8 August 1925 | 1940 | Transferred to the Polish Merchant Navy and sunk in 1944 as part of a Normandy breakwater. |

==== Decommissioned after 1947 ====
| Class / project | Displacement (tonnes) | Length (m) | Image | Ship | Commissioned | Decommissioned | Notes | References |
|---|---|---|---|---|---|---|---|---|
| Project 888 (Wodnik class) | standard: 1489 full load: 1745 | 72.24 | | ORP Gryf | 26 September 1976 | 31 May 2005 | | |
| Gaff-rigged schooner | 500 | 50.7 | | ORP Iskra | 6 May 1928 | 26 November 1977 | | |
| Hansa A | standard: 3244 full load: 4222 | 91.83 | | ORP Gryf | 10 July 1951 | 24 September 1976 | Formerly ORP Zetempowiec. | |

=== Auxiliary vessels ===
| Displacement (tonnes) | Length (m) | Image | Ship | Commissioned | Decommissioned | Notes |
|---|---|---|---|---|---|---|
| 2,450 | 96.9 | | ORP Sławomir Czerwiński | 15 November 1932 | 25 September 1937 | Former passenger ship used as a submarine depot ship. |
| 6,100 GRT | 80.0 | | ORP Warta | 3 June 1924 | 22 April 1927 | Naval transport. |
| 110 | 29.0 | | ORP Nurek | 1 November 1936 | 1 September 1939 | Diving support ship, sunk on 1 September 1939. |
| 35 | 20 | | Nurek | 1924 | 24 September 1936 | Diving support vessel. |

== River Flotilla ships ==
=== River monitors ===
| Class / project | Displacement (tonnes) | Length (m) | Image | Ship | Commissioned | Decommissioned | Notes |
|---|---|---|---|---|---|---|---|
| B type | standard: 110.0 full load: 126.5 | 34.5 | | ORP Warszawa | 13 August 1920 | 18 September 1939 | Scuttled by her crew, raised by the Soviet Union and sunk in 1941. |
| B type | standard: 110.0 full load: 126.5 | 34.5 | | ORP Toruń | 13 August 1920 | 18 September 1939 | Scuttled by her crew, raised by the Soviet Union and sunk in 1941. |
| B type | standard: 110.0 full load: 126.5 | 34.5 | | ORP Pińsk | 20 October 1920 | 18 September 1939 | Scuttled by her crew, raised by the Soviet Union and sunk in 1941. |
| B type | standard: 110.0 full load: 126.5 | 34.5 | | ORP Horodyszcze | 1921 | 18 September 1939 | Scuttled by her crew, raised by the Soviet Union and sunk in 1941. |
| 1923 type | 70.3 | 35.0 | | ORP Kraków | 15 October 1926 | 21 September 1939 | Scuttled; later served in the Soviet Navy as Smolensk and was scuttled again in 1941. |
| 1923 type | 70.3 | 35.0 | | ORP Wilno | 15 October 1926 | 18 September 1939 | Scuttled by her crew in September 1939. |

=== River gunboats ===
| Displacement (tonnes) | Length (m) | Image | Ship | Commissioned | Decommissioned | Notes |
|---|---|---|---|---|---|---|
| 32 | 18.1 | | Zuchwała | 15 June 1933 | 19 September 1939 | Scuttled by her crew. |
| 32 | 18.1 | | Zawzięta | 15 June 1933 | 19 September 1939 | Scuttled, raised by the Soviet Union, sunk in 1941 and scrapped in 1944. |
| 32 | 18.1 | | Zaradna | 1935 | 18 September 1939 | Scuttled, raised by the Soviet Union, later captured by Germany and sunk on 11 April 1942. |

=== Armed river vessels ===
| Displacement (tonnes) | Length (m) | Image | Ship | Commissioned | Decommissioned | Notes |
|---|---|---|---|---|---|---|
| 54 | 30.5 | | ORP Generał Sikorski | March 1920 | 18 September 1939 | Scuttled, raised by the Soviet Union and commissioned as Bug; sunk on the Danube in July 1941. |
| 114 | 36.0 | | ORP Hetman Chodkiewicz | 1921 | 18 September 1939 | Scuttled in September 1939. |
| 168 | 47.6 | | ORP Admirał Dickman | 1922 | 1937 | Converted into a target ship. |
| 163 | 41.6 | | ORP Generał Szeptycki | May 1920 | 18 September 1939 | Scuttled, raised by the Soviet Union and sunk in 1941; later raised and used by Germany. |

=== River staff ships ===
| Displacement (tonnes) | Length (m) | Image | Ship | Commissioned | Decommissioned | Notes |
|---|---|---|---|---|---|---|
| 118 | 45.0 | | ORP Admirał Sierpinek | 13 August 1920 | 18 September 1939 | Scuttled, raised by the Soviet Union and commissioned as the staff ship Pripyat; later sunk by the Luftwaffe. |

== See also ==
- List of ships of the Polish Navy

== Bibliography ==
- Rochowicz, Robert (2015). "ORP Warszawa (II). Po co był nam ten niszczyciel?". Morze, Statki i Okręty (in Polish) (Wydanie specjalne 1). Magnum X: 58–69. ISSN 1426-529X.
- Rochowicz, Robert (2015). "Dzieje niszczyciela ORP Warszawa". Morze, Statki i Okręty (in Polish) (Wydanie specjalne 1). Magnum X: 42–57. ISSN 1426-529X.
- Ciślak, Jarosław (1995). Polska Marynarka Wojenna 1995 (in Polish). Bellona i Lampart. ISBN 83-86776-08-0.
- Rochowicz, Robert (2016). "Kutry trałowe w MW PRL w latach 1955–1982". Morza i Okręty (in Polish) (1). ISSN 2450-3509.
- Ciślak, Jarosław (2014). "Jednostki lekkich sił uderzeniowych Marynarki Wojennej". Morze, Statki i Okręty (in Polish) (Wydanie specjalne 2). Magnum X: 19–29. ISSN 1426-529X.
- Soroka, Marek (1986). Polskie okręty wojenne 1945–1980 (in Polish). Gdańsk: Wydawnictwo Morskie. ISBN 83-215-3249-7.
- Serafin, Mieczysław (2008). Polska Marynarka Wojenna 1945–2007. Kronika wydarzeń (in Polish). Gdynia: Zespół Redakcyjno-Wydawniczy Marynarki Wojennej. ISBN 978-83-88698-03-3.
- Kamiński, Jerzy M. (2008). "Współczesne "ptaszki", czyli historia projektu 206". Morze, Statki i Okręty (in Polish) (9). Magnum-X. ISSN 1426-529X.
- Koszela, Witold (2017). Okręty Floty Polskiej (in Polish). Vol. II. Oświęcim: Wydawnictwo Napoleon V. ISBN 978-83-65746-68-9.
- Rochowicz, Robert (2001a). "Z dziejów Polskiej Marynarki Wojennej. Rok 1964". Morza, Statki i Okręty (in Polish) (3). Magnum-X. ISSN 1426-529X.
- Rochowicz, Robert (2017). "Zdobywcy Europy, czyli Polskie barki desantowe LCT Mk5 i LCM Mk3". Morze (in Polish) (3). Zespół Badań i Analiz Militarnych: 30–41. ISSN 2543-5469.
- Rochowicz, Robert (2014). "Kutry desantowe Polskiej Marynarki Wojennej". Morze, Statki i Okręty (in Polish) (Wydanie specjalne 3). Magnum X: 43–51. ISSN 1426-529X.
- Rochowicz, Robert (July–August 2019). "Jeden okręt – dwa wcielenia". Morze, Statki i Okręty (in Polish). XXIV (7–8). Warszawa.
- Nowak, Grzegorz (12 February 2021). Okręty Polskiej Marynarki Wojennej. Tom 47: ORP Wodnik, Polskie Okręty Szkolne (in Polish). Warsaw.
