= SS Omsk =

A number of steamships have carried the name Omsk.

- SS Omsk (1884), built for DFDS Line. Torpedoed and sunk on 15 August 1917 by U-84
- SS Omsk (1944), transferred to the Soviet Government in 1947, sold to Poland in 1950.
