= ORP Gryf (1957) =

Polish Navy school and hospital ship

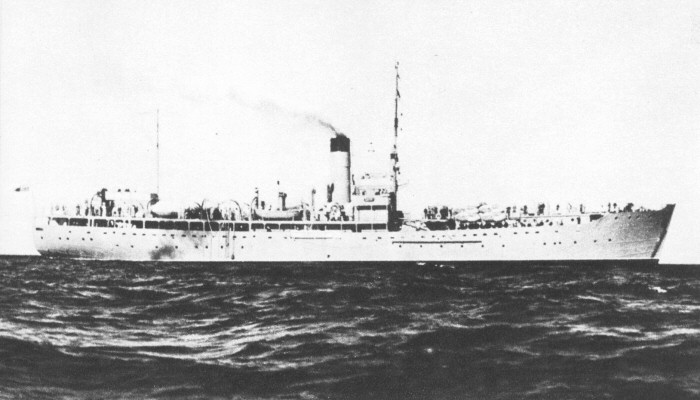

History
- Name: Irene Oldendorff (1944–45); Empire Contay (1945–46); Omsk (1946–47); Opole (1947–50); Zetempowiec (1950–57); Gryf (1957–76)
- Owner: E Oldendorff (1944–45); Ministry of War Transport (1945); Ministry of Transport (1945–46); Soviet Government (1946–47); Zegluga Polska SA (1947–50); Marynarka Wojenna Rzeczypospolitej Polskiej (1950- )
- Operator: E Oldendorff (1944–45); Constantine Steamship Co Ltd (1945–46); Soviet Government (1946–47); Zegluga Polska SA (1947–50); Marynarka Wojenna Rzeczypospolitej Polskiej (1950–76)
- Port of registry: (Nazi Germany) Lübeck (1944–45); (United Kingdom) London (1945–46); Soviet Union (1946–47); Poland (1947–50); (Poland) Polish Navy (1950–76)
- Builder: Burmeister & Wain
- Launched: 1944
- Commissioned: 10 July 1951
- Decommissioned: 1976
- Identification: Code letters STAY (Gryf)

General characteristics
- Class & type: Cargo ship (1944–57); Training ship and hospital ship (1957–76); Hulk (1976- )
- Tonnage: 1,923 GRT (1944–51); 935 NRT (1944–51)
- Displacement: 4,220 Tons (1951–76)
- Length: 279 ft 8 in (85.24 m)
- Beam: 44 ft 3 in (13.49 m)
- Depth: 18 ft 7 in (5.66 m)
- Installed power: Compound steam engine
- Propulsion: Screw propeller
- Speed: 11.2 knots (20.7 km/h)
- Range: 5,700 nautical miles (10,600 km; 6,600 mi) at 10 knots (19 km/h)
- Armament: 2 x 85mm AA guns, 4 x 37mm AA guns (1951–76)

ORP Gryf was a school and hospital ship of the Polish Navy, a second vessel to bear that name. She was built in German-occupied Denmark as a cargo ship in 1944, shortly before the end of World War II and initially named Irene Oldendorff. Soon after the capitulation of Germany, she was taken by the United Kingdom, passed to the Ministry of War Transport (MoWT) and renamed Empire Contees, but in 1946 it was given to the Soviet Union as part of that country's war reparations from Germany. Renamed Omsk (Омск), she served in the Soviet merchant fleet until 1947 when she was handed over to Poland.

In 1950, she was acquired by the Polish Navy and rebuilt as a school and hospital ship. Initially named ORP Zetempowiec (after the Union of Polish Youth), in 1957 she was renamed Gryf after the notable WWII minelayer. In 1976 she was decommissioned and sold to the Port of Gdynia, where she served as a heating barge. Her role of a school ship was taken by a new ORP Gryf.

== Description ==
The ship was built in 1944 by Burmeister & Wain, Copenhagen.

As built, the ship was 279 feet 8 inches (85.24 m) long, with a beam of 44 feet 3 inches (13.49 m) and a depth of 18 feet 7 inches (5.66 m). She was 1,923 DWT, 935 NRT.

The ship was propelled by a compound steam engine which had two cylinders of 16 9/16 inches (42.1 cm) and two cylinders of 35 7/16 inches (90.0 cm) diameter by 35 7/16 inches (90.0 cm) stroke. The engine was built by Burmeister & Wain. It could propel her at a maximum speed of 11.2 knots (20.7 km/h).

== History ==
Irene Oldendorff was built for E Oldendorff, Lübeck. On 14 September 1944, she was reported to be in a damaged condition at Copenhagen. The ship had been sunk by sabotage. Although repaired, she was again reported as damaged in March 1945. She was seized in May 1945 at Lübeck, passed to the MoWT and renamed Empire Contees. She was placed under the management of the Constantine Steamship Co Ltd.

In 1946, Empire Contees was transferred to the Soviet Union and was renamed Omsk. On 13 April 1947, she was handed over to Zegluga Polska SA, Poland and was renamed Opole. On 24 November 1950, Opole was transferred to the Polish Navy. She was rebuilt as a training ship and hospital ship at a cost of zł100,000,000. The conversion was undertaken at the Stocznia Gdynia and was completed in 152 days. Opole was renamed ORP Zetempowiec and commissioned into the Polish Navy on 10 July 1951. Following conversion, Zetempowiec had a displacement of 4,220 tons.

Armament was two 85mm AA guns and four 37mm AA guns. In 1957, Zetempowiec was renamed Gryf. She remained as a training ship. Photographs show that Gryf used the code letters STAY. Gryf won the title of the best ship in the Polish Navy in 1970 and again in 1971. Gryf was decommissioned in 1976, and was thereafter used as an accommodation hulk.
