= KT-73 =

Polish motor torpedo boat

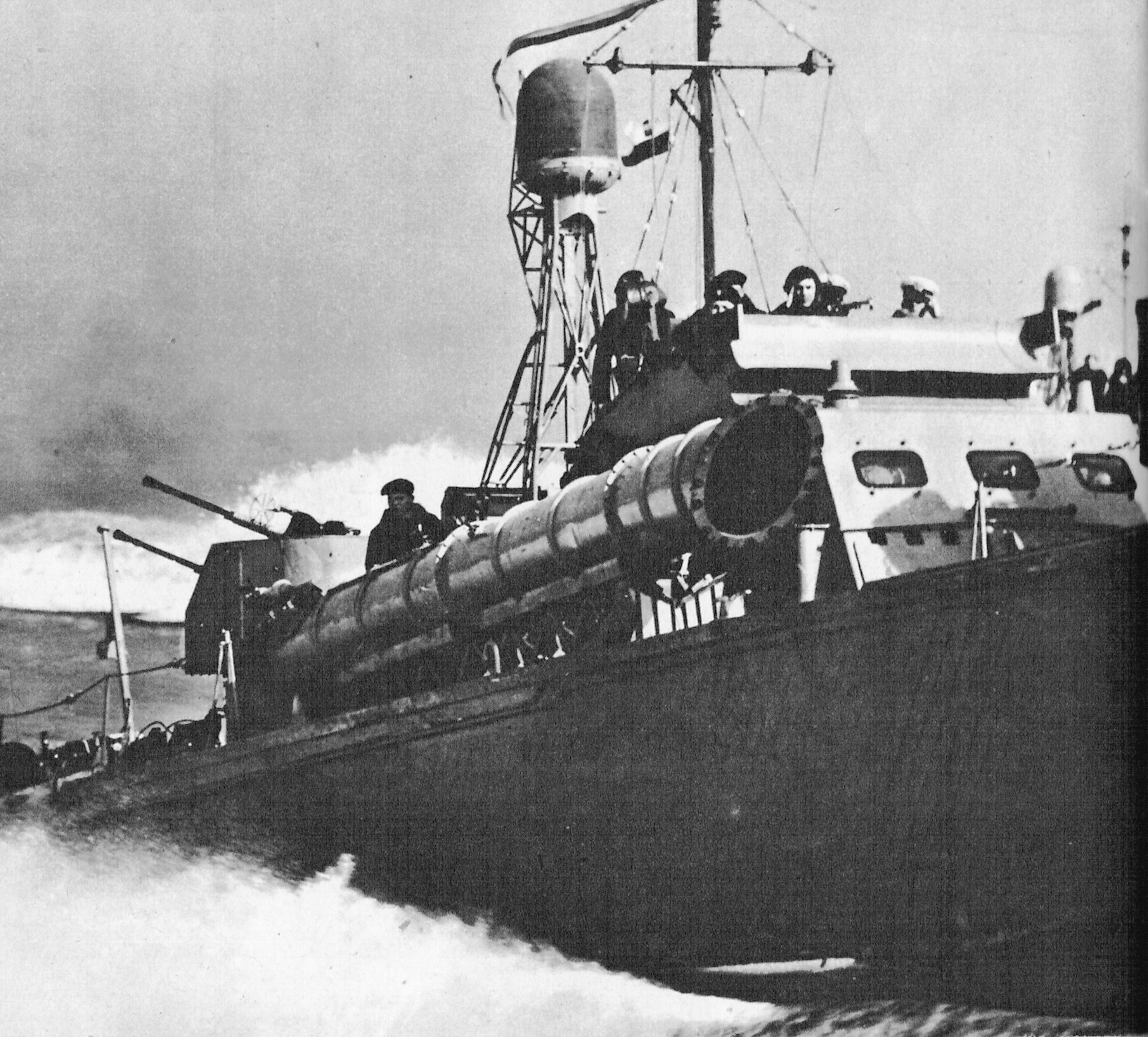
- Midsection of the P 6-class torpedo boat

History

Soviet Union
- Name: 207
- Builder: shipyard no. 5, Leningrad

History

Poland
- Name: KT-73
- Commissioned: October 11, 1958
- Decommissioned: January 1, 1971

General characteristics
- Class & type: P 6-class torpedo boat
- Displacement: standard: 56 t (55 long tons); full: 67 t (66 long tons)
- Length: 25.5 m (83 ft 8 in)
- Beam: 6.1 m (20 ft 0 in)
- Draft: 1.13 m (3 ft 8 in)
- Propulsion: 4 M-50F diesel engines with a combined output of 4,800 hp; 4 propellers
- Speed: 43 kn (80 km/h; 49 mph)
- Range: 1,000 nautical miles at a speed of 14 kn (26 km/h; 16 mph)
- Crew: 14
- Sensors & processing systems: Tros fire control system; Kremnij-1 identification friend or foe system; Zarnica radar
- Armament: 4 × 25 mm 2M-3M guns (2 twin mounts); 8–12 depth charges, optionally 18 naval mines; 2 × 533 mm torpedo tubes

KT-73 was a Polish motor torpedo boat from the Cold War period, one of 19 Soviet P 6-class torpedo boats acquired by Poland. The unit was built at shipyard no. 5 in Leningrad, then leased to Poland, and commissioned into the Polish Navy on 11 October 1958. The vessel, intensively utilized and marked with hull numbers KT-73 and 403, was decommissioned in January 1971.

== Design and construction ==
Work on a large motor torpedo boat began in the Soviet Union in 1946. The final design, designated 183, was developed by the CKB-5 design bureau in Leningrad, with the prototype handed over to the Soviet Navy in 1949. Compared to its predecessors, the new vessels featured improved seakeeping capabilities, superior armament, and greater speed. Serial production commenced in 1952, with a total of 360 units built by 1960. The boats were tasked with executing independent or coordinated torpedo attacks on surface targets in coastal and enclosed waters.

In the early 1950s, the Polish Navy Command considered building torpedo boats domestically under the TD-200 project. However, in October 1954, it was decided to abandon domestic construction in favor of purchasing or leasing more modern P 6-class torpedo boats from the Soviet Union. In 1955, Poland secured Soviet approval to purchase five new, unused boats of this type at a cost of 2.5 million rubles per unit. Three additional boats were purchased in 1957. For economic reasons, the subsequent acquisition of 11 vessels was arranged through a lease agreement, costing a total of 12.6 million rubles.

The future KT-73 was constructed at shipyard no. 5 (Katiernyj Zawod) in Leningrad. The unit was likely built in 1953 and, upon completion, was preserved on land in Kaliningrad without entering active service. In the Soviet Navy, the vessel was designated with hull number 207.

== Technical and tactical data ==
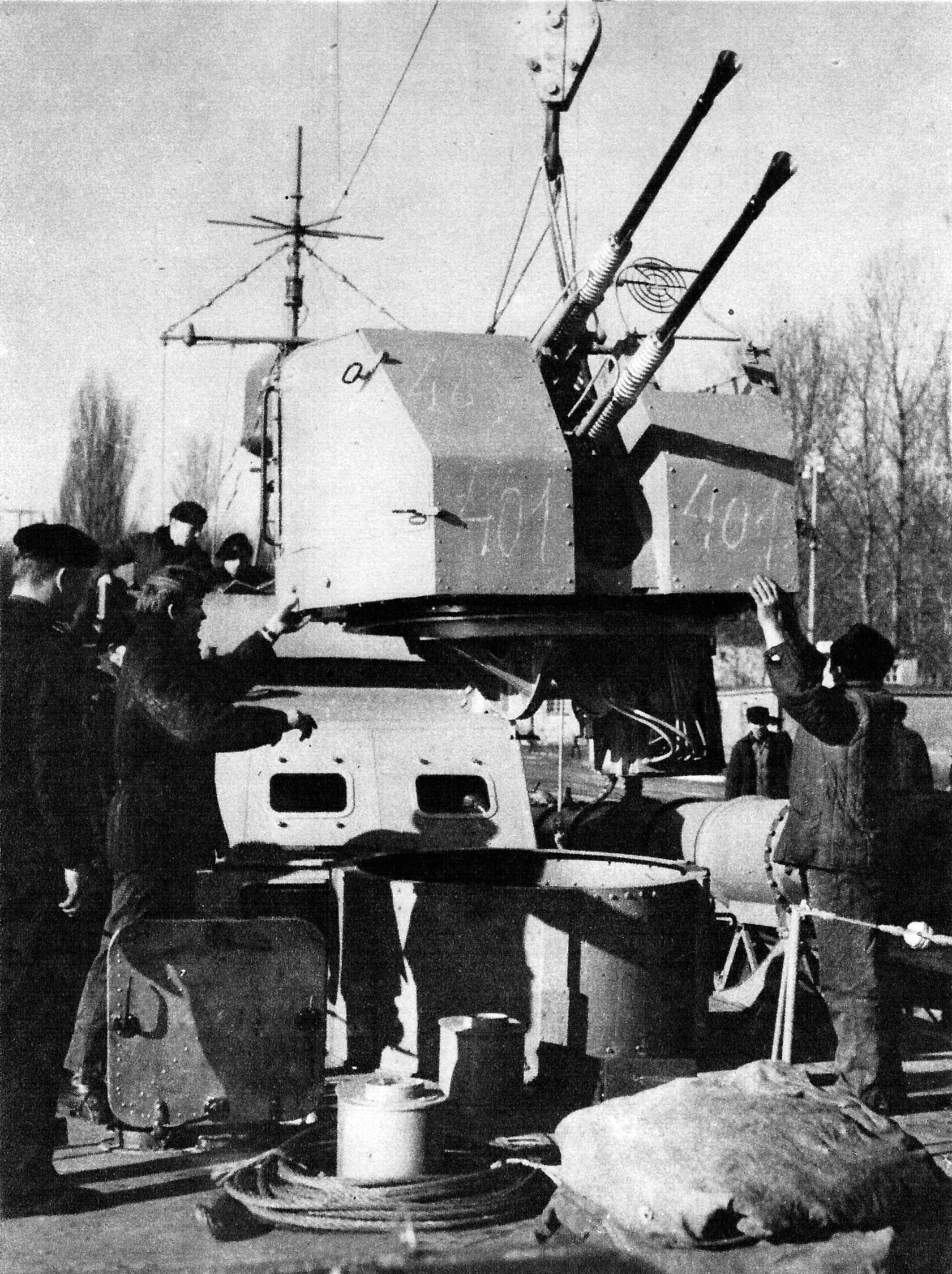
Installation of the 2M-3M system on the deck of the boat

The vessel was a large motor torpedo boat. The total length of its wooden hull was 25.5 meters, with a beam of 6.1 meters and a draft of 1.13 meters. The standard displacement was 56 tons, and the full displacement was 67 tons. The hull was divided into eight compartments (from the bow): I – forepeak, II – crew quarters, III – officer quarters and galley, IV – generator room, officer quarters, and social facilities, V and VI – engines, VII – fuel tanks, and VIII – ammunition magazine and rudder compartment. In the midsection, there was a small open superstructure, behind which were a collapsible mast and a ventilation shaft for the engine room. The vessel was powered by four four-stroke M-50F diesel engines with a combined output of 4,800 hp, driving four fixed-pitch propellers. The maximum speed of the vessel was 43 knots, and the economical speed was 32.9 knots. The vessel carried 10.3 tons of fuel, providing a range of 1,000 nautical miles at a speed of 14 knots or 600 nautical miles at a speed of 32.9 knots. Electric power was supplied by five diesel generators: one DG-12.5 (with 17 hp) and four with 1.36 hp each. The vessel's autonomy was 5 days, and it could go to sea in winds up to force 8 on the Beaufort scale. The manual allowed for sailing at maximum speed and using armaments in sea state 3.

The vessel was equipped with two single TTKA-53M torpedo tubes (caliber 533 mm), mounted along the sides amidships with a 6° outward offset, carrying two torpedoes of the 53-38U or 53-39 type. The vessel's artillery armament consisted of two twin 2M-3M autocannons (caliber 25 mm), with a total ammunition supply of 4,000 rounds, mounted in front of the superstructure (offset to the left of the vessel's longitudinal axis to improve visibility from the bridge) and on the stern. Its anti-submarine warfare armament consisted of 8–12 BB-1 depth charges, located along the sides in the stern section, behind the torpedo tubes. Optionally, instead of torpedoes and depth charges, the vessel could carry 18 AMD-500 naval mines. The electronic equipment included the Tros fire control system, Kremnij-1 identification friend or foe system, R-609 radio communication station, and Zarnica radar. The vessel was also equipped with stern-mounted launchers for 12 smoke candles.

The vessel's crew consisted of 14 members – 2 officers, 9 petty officers, and 3 sailors.

== Service ==
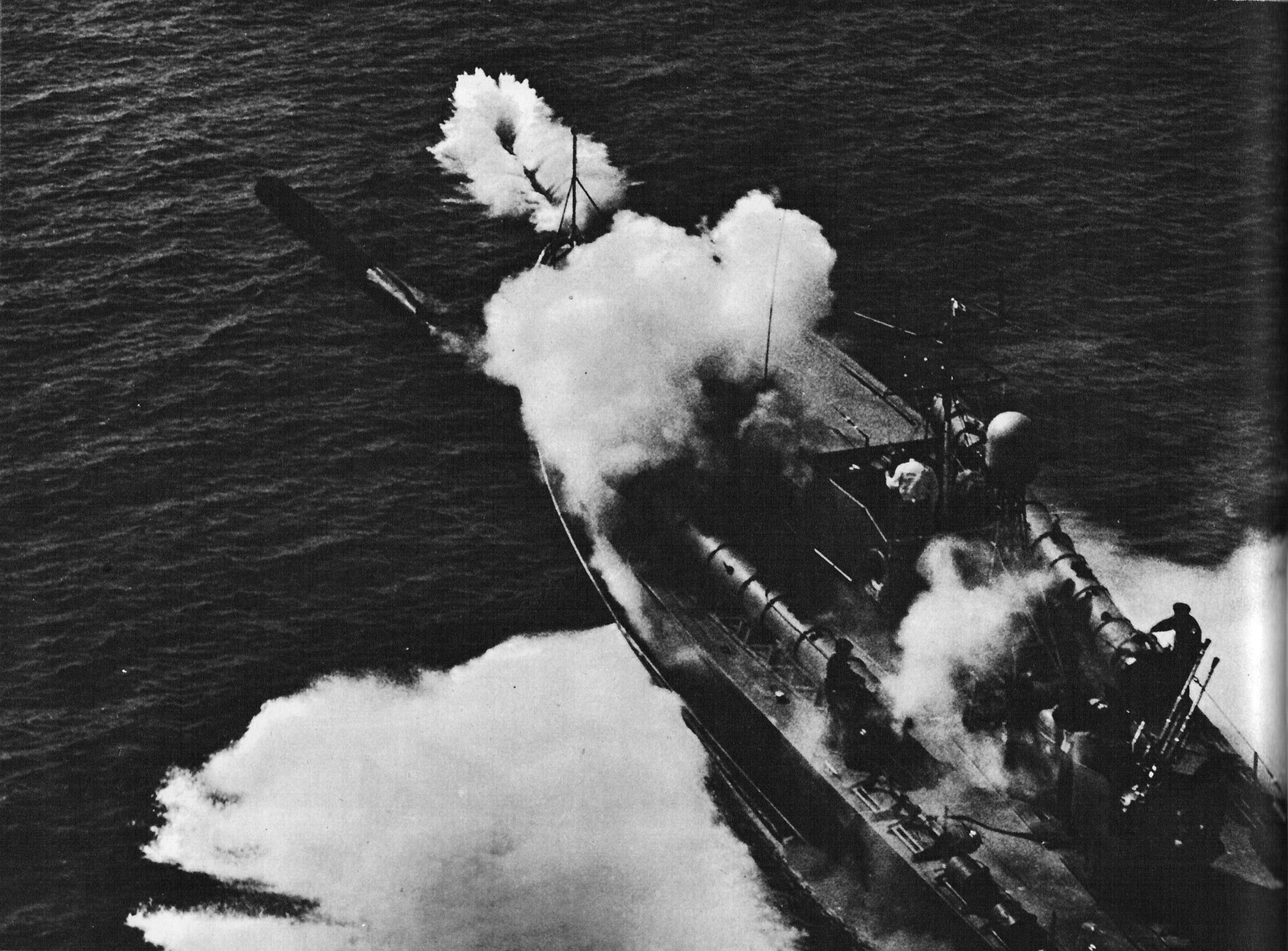
Moment of torpedo launch from the deck of the Polish P 6-class torpedo boat

After the lease agreement was signed on 5 September 1958, the unit, designated KT-73 (KT – torpedo boat), was incorporated into the Polish Navy on 11 October 1958 by order of the Commander of the Navy (No. 044/Org.), along with its sister ships KT-71, KT-72, KT-74, KT-75, KT-76, KT-77, KT-78, KT-79, KT-91, and KT-92. Initially, the vessel was part of the Torpedo Boat Squadron stationed in Gdynia, which was restructured in November 1958 into the Torpedo Boat Brigade, also based in Gdynia. On 1 January 1960, the vessel's hull number was changed to 403. After the lease period ended, the unit was purchased by the Polish Navy on 1 January 1962 for 120,000 PLN. Following a reorganization in 1965, the Torpedo Boat Brigade was renamed the 3rd Torpedo Boat Brigade, and the vessel was assigned to the 2nd Torpedo Boat Squadron.

During its long service, the boat (like other Polish P 6-class units) was intensively used, participating in exercises and maneuvers, and many naval specialists were trained aboard it. By order no. 041/Org. of the Commander of the Navy, the ship was decommissioned from the fleet on 1 September 1970. The ensign was lowered for the last time on 1 January 1971.
