= Type 02 torpedo boat =

Class overview
- Name: Type 02 Torpedo Boat
- Builders: Wuhu & Guangzhou shipyards
- Operators: People's Liberation Army Navy
- Preceded by: P 6-class
- Succeeded by: Type 025
- Subclasses: Type 6702, 7102, 0101
- Completed: 63

General characteristics
- Type: Torpedo boat
- Displacement: 62 long tons (63 t)
- Length: 25.05 m (82 ft 2 in)
- Beam: 6.06 m (19 ft 11 in)
- Height: 3.04 m (10 ft 0 in)
- Draft: 1.04 m (3 ft 5 in)
- Installed power: Internal combustion engine
- Propulsion: 4 × M-50-1 Diesel engine, 1,200 hp (895 kW)
- Speed: 43 knots (80 km/h; 49 mph)
- Range: 600 mi (970 km)
- Complement: 16
- Sensors & processing systems: 1 × navigational radar
- Armament: 2 x 533.4 mm (21.00 in) torpedoes; 2 x twin 25 mm (0.98 in) guns

The Type 02 torpedo boat is a family of Chinese torpedo boats developed from the Soviet P 6-class torpedo boat, and these boats have since retired from active service in the People's Liberation Army Navy (PLAN).

== Development ==
In 1954, People's Republic of China (PRC) and former Soviet Union (USSR) reached agreement to allow PRC to license produce Soviet P-6 torpedo boats under the supervision of Soviet technical advisors, with components and blue prints supplied by USSR. In the February 1955, construction of the first boat in China begun at Wuhu Shipyard (芜湖造船厂), the predecessor of the Wuhu Xinlian Shipbuilding Co., Ltd. (芜湖新联造船有限公司), where a total of 51 boats were eventually built. Half a year later in August of that same year, construction of the first boat of the second production line begun at Guangzhou Shipyard, where 12 boats were eventually completed.

After completion of 12 boats at Guangzhou shipyard and 12 boats at Wuhu shipyard, USSR encountered difficulty to supply the specialized wood needed, so effort was spent to find domestic Chinese wood as a necessary replacement. From the 25th unit that begun construction in 1957, domestic Chinese wood had been used to successfully replace the imported wood. A total of 63 boats were completed, with 51 by Wuhu Shipyard, 12 by Guangzhou Shipyard. Originally equipped with Type 512 radar, most of boats were eventually had it replaced by Type 351.

== Variants ==
Several variants of Type 02 series torpedo boats have produced, including the following:

- Type 6602: First 24 units produced in China, differs from the original Soviet P-6 class in lack of the depth charges, because ROCN, the adversary of PLAN, did not have any submarines.
- Type 02: 25th units onward, with domestic Chinese wood replaced the imported Soviet wood.
- Type 0101: Derivative of Type 02 as an enlarged wooden-hulled gunboat version, developed under the supervision of Soviet advisor, with displacement increased to 75 tons.
- Type 6702: Version incorporating the steel hull of Type 0112 gunboat, entering service in December 1969 after 9 months development.
- Type 7102II: Steel hulled Type 02, first entering service in December 1974.
