= Radio communication station =

Equipment needed to communicate via radio waves

A radio communication station is a set of equipment necessary to carry on communication via radio waves. Generally, it is a receiver or transmitter or transceiver, an antenna, and some smaller additional equipment necessary to operate them. They play a vital role in communication technology as they are heavily relied on to transfer data and information across the world.

More broadly, the definition of a radio station includes the aforementioned equipment and a building in which it is installed. Such a station may include several "radio stations" defined above (i.e. several sets of receivers or transmitters installed in one building but functioning independently, and several antennas installed on a field next to the building). This definition of a radio station is more often referred to as a transmitter site, transmitter station, transmission facility or transmitting station. An example of this definition is Bethany Relay Station of the Voice of America which had seven broadcast transmitters and could broadcast up to seven independent programs (even produced by different broadcasters) simultaneously, as well as several communications transmitters and receivers.

== ITU definition ==
The International Telecommunication Union, defines a radio (communication) station as - «one or more transmitters or receivers or a combination of transmitters and receivers, including the accessory equipment, necessary at one location for carrying on a radio communication service, or the radio astronomy service. Each station shall be classified by the service in which it operates permanently or temporarily».

== Equipment ==
- Transmitter - Takes the electrical output of a microphone and then modulates a higher-frequency carrier signal and transmits it as radio waves.
- Receiver - The broadcast message is received by the receiver and decodes the radio sine waves.
- Antenna - An antenna is required for transmission; it is also required to receive radio waves. The main use of an antenna is to send radio signals.
- Aerial feeder - system of feeding HF-Energy (power) in the antenna
- Transmission lines - Transmission lines are used to transfer the radio signals to other locations.
- Connectors Interface panel remote control – This is used to connect various different types of the equipment used in a radio station. To input broadcast data into a transmitter an interface panel will need to be used.
- Cable – A cable can be used to connect the various devices.
- Equipment Rack – To hold all equipment in a secure and logical manner, an equipment rack will be used.
- Power protection equipment – For holding equipment's in a stable, secure and logical manner.
- UPS – For uninterrupted power supply.

These are the most used/important devices and items for most radio stations.

=== Antennas ===
A microphone is used to capture the input of sound waves created by people speaking into the device. The sounds are then turned into electrical energy; this energy then flows along a metal antenna. As the electrons in the electric current move back and forth up the antenna, the current creates an invisible electromagnetic radiation in the form of radio waves. The waves travel at the speed of light, taking the radio program (voices recorded) with them.

=== Transceiver ===
A compound of both a transmitter and a receiver is called a transceiver, they are combined and share common circuitry or a single housing. Technically transceivers must combine a significant amount of the transmitter and receiver handling the circuitry.

== Radio frequency list ==
Possible Frequency allocations, allotments & assignments

- Broadcasting service (AM sound broadcasting) - 535 to 1606.5 kHz
- Broadcasting service (HF sound broadcasting) - bands from 5.9 to 26.1 MHz
- Mobile service (citizens band radio) - 26.96 to 27.41 MHz
- Amateur Radio Service [Public Service & Emergency Radio Services] (Ham Radio) - bands from 135.7 kHz & up
- Broadcasting service (television, channels 2 through 6) - 54 to 88 MHz
- Broadcasting service (FM sound broadcasting) - 88 to 108 MHz
- Broadcasting service (television, channels 7 through 13) - 174 to 220 MHz
- FIXED SERVICE, MOBILE SERVICE, (generic frequency allotment) garage door opener - around 40 MHz
- MOBILE SERVICE (generic frequency allotment) standard digital cordless phones (DECT) - 40 to 50 MHz
- MOBILE SERVICE baby monitors - 49 MHz
- MOBILE SERVICE radio controlled airplanes - around 72 MHz
- Mobile service cell phones - 824 to 849 MHz
- Space research service (deep space) - 2290 MHz to 2300 MHz

== See also ==
- Space radio station
