= P 6-class torpedo boat =

Motor torpedo boat class of the Soviet Navy

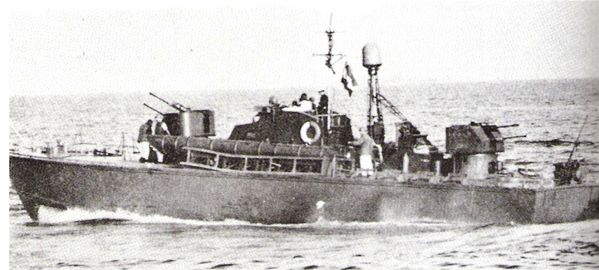
- Egyptian Navy P 6 torpedo boat, circa 1967

Class overview
- Name: Project 183 "Bolshevik"
- Builders: Shipyard No.5, Leningrad; Shipyard No.602, Vladivostok; Shipyard No.640, Sosnovka; Guangzhou Shipyard, Guangzhou; Wuhu Shipyard, Wuhu
- Operators: Soviet Navy; Algerian National Navy; People's Liberation Army Navy; Cuban Revolutionary Navy; Egyptian Navy; Ethiopian Navy; Navy of Equatorial Guinea; Volksmarine; Guinea Army; Guinea-Bissau Army; Indonesian Navy; Iraqi Navy; Kazakh Naval Forces; Korean People's Navy; Polish Navy; Somali Navy; Syrian Navy; Tanzania Naval Command; Vietnam People's Navy; Yemeni Navy
- Preceded by: P 4 class
- Succeeded by: Shershen class; Type 025 (China); Project 664 (Poland)
- Subclasses: P 8; P 10; Type 02; Komar class; Shantou class
- Built: 1949-1960 (Soviet Union)
- Completed: ~421 (Soviet Union)

General characteristics
- Type: Motor Torpedo Boat
- Displacement: 67.1 long tons (68.2 t)
- Length: 25.5 m (83 ft 8 in)
- Beam: 6.18 m (20 ft 3 in)
- Draft: 1.24 m (4 ft 1 in)
- Propulsion: 4 × Soviet M-50T diesel engines, 4,800 hp (3,579 kW), 4 shafts
- Speed: 43 knots (80 km/h; 49 mph)
- Range: 1,000 nmi (1,900 km; 1,200 mi)
- Complement: 14
- Sensors & processing systems: 1 × Soviet I band Zarnitsa (Skin Head) navigational radar
- Armament: 2 × 533 mm (21.0 in) torpedoes; 2 × twin 25 mm 2M-3 autocannons; 8 x BB-1 depth charges; Sea mines could be added by replacing torpedo tubes

The P 6-class torpedo boat, Soviet designation Project 183 Bolshevik, were Soviet wood-hulled motor torpedo boats produced shortly after World War II. They were armed with two twin 25 mm autocannons and two 533 mm (21.0 in) torpedoes.

== Design and development ==
A large torpedo boat developed shortly after World War II, the Project 183 "Bolshevik" torpedo boats were influenced by the American-built Vosper, Elco, and Higgins motor torpedo boats delivered to the Soviet Union via Lend-lease. The development was carried out by the No.5 shipyard in Leningrad, and had a hull designed to be semi-planing with sharp lines, compared to the earlier full hydroplaning Soviet designs like the G-5 or Project 123-bis. The boat was made out of wood and powered by four M-50 diesel engines, and able to reach a maximum speed of 43 knots (80 km/h; 49 mph).

The ships were armed with two twin 25 mm autocannons with 2,000 rounds of ammunition, two 533 mm torpedo tubes, and eight depth charges. Additionally sea mines could be taken to replace the torpedo tubes.

The Project 183 was used as the basis for multiple derivative designs, such as the Project 183-R missile boat, the first mass-produced missile boat which also scored the first combat kill with an anti-ship missile, the Project 199, a sub hunter derivative fitted with a sonar for the border guard, and the Chinese Type 55A, a gunboat fitted with larger calibre guns.

== Service history ==
The first P 6 torpedo boat was delivered in 1949, and construction was carried out by three shipyards, building a total of around 420 boats. The ships were well-liked by their crews, and a large amount of them were exported to allied nations. Most of the ships were retired by the 1980s. Some were converted to passenger or transport ships.

In 1953, the People's Republic of China bought 39 P 6 torpedo boats from the Soviet Union and the plans to build their own. The Soviets provided assistance to start local production, where it is known as the Type 02 torpedo boat, and a total of 63–80 boats were built. Some of the ships were built with steel hulls instead of wooden ones as there was difficulty finding suitable wood. The ships participated in actions against the Republic of China Navy, and were all retired by the 1990s.

Egypt acquired about 46 units from 1956-1970. They saw action against Israel in the Six-Day War, including an action where the Israeli destroyer Eilat and accompanying torpedo boats sank two P 6 boats.

== Variants ==
- Project 183: NATO reporting name: P 6 class.
- Project 183-A: Experimental torpedo boat with arctilite (a type of wood composite) hull.
- Project 183-T: NATO reporting name: P 8 class, experimental P 6 torpedo boat with an additional gas turbine engine, able to reach 49.7 knots.
- Project 183-TK: NATO reporting name: P 10 class, mass-produced version of the P 8, able to reach 48.5 knots.
- Project 183-U: Experimental torpedo boat with four torpedo tubes and more powerful diesel engines, able to reach 47 knots.
- Project 183-Ts: Remote radio-controlled target boat, fitted with Quartz-49 remote control system.
- Project 183-KUTs: Target control boat.
- Project 183-E: Experimental missile boat with two P-15 missiles, precursor to the Komar-class.
- Project 183-R: NATO reporting name: Komar class, first mass-produced missile boat type.
- Project 199: Submarine hunter built for the KGB Border Troops, equipped with sonar.

=== Chinese variants ===
- Type 6602/Type 02: Chinese designation for Project 183.
- Type 6702: Type 6602 boats converted to a steel hull.
- Type 7102II: Type 6602 boats built with a steel hull.
- Type 55A: NATO reporting name: Shantou class, steel-hulled gunboat variant armed with two twin 37 mm guns and two 12.7 mm heavy machine guns.

=== Egyptian variants ===
- Project 183 with BM-21: 12 Egyptian P 6s were modified with a Grad MLRS replacing the aft gun and torpedo tubes and a different radar.
