= Orkan =

Orkan may refer to:

== People ==
=== Given name ===
- Orkan Balkan (born 1997), Turkish football player
- Orkan Çınar (born 1996), Turkish football player

=== Surname ===
- Władysław Orkan (1875–1930), Polish writer

== Ships ==
- ORP Orkan, name of several Polish ships
- ORP Orkan (1992), Polish missile boat of the Orkan class
- Orkan, a WWII Vorpostenboot

== Others ==
- European windstorm in several European languages
- M-87 Orkan, Yugoslav multiple rocket launcher
- Ikarus Orkan, a Yugoslav light bomber/reconnaissance aircraft used during WWII
- Operation Orkan 91, military operation during the Croatian War of Independence
- Orkan-e Kord, village in Qazvin Province, Iran
- Orkan-e Tork, village in Qazvin Province, Iran
- Orkan (album), a 2012 album by Swedish band
- an alien race from the television series Mork & Mindy
