= ORP Czajka (1966) =

Polish minesweeper

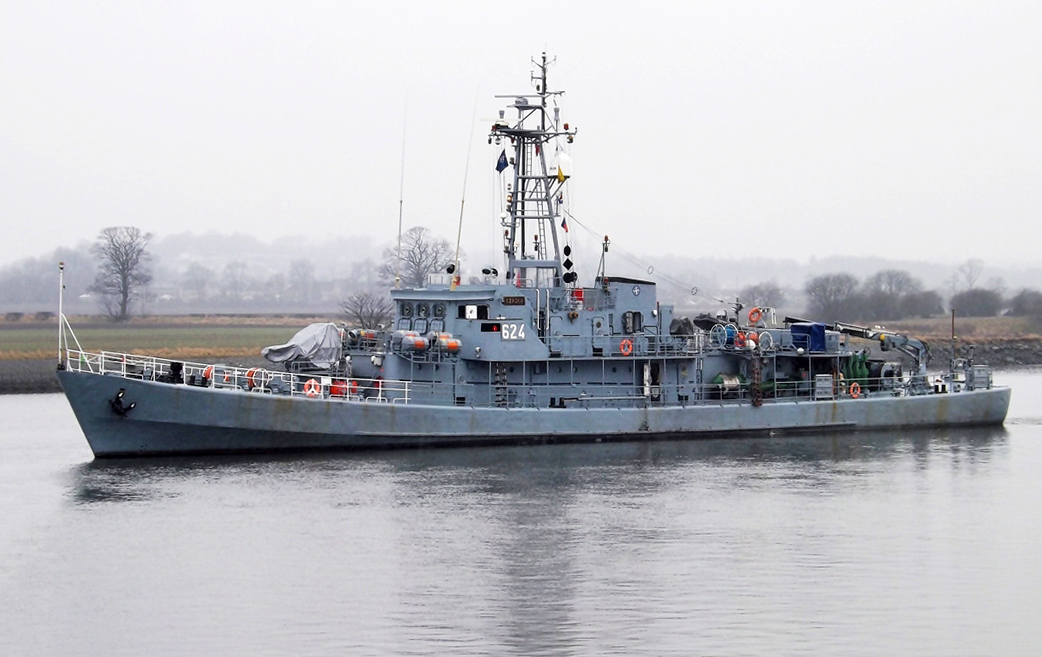
- ORP Czajka after reconstruction in 2013

History

Poland
- Name: ORP Czajka
- Builder: Stocznia Gdynia, Gdynia
- Laid down: September 12, 1966
- Launched: December 17, 1966
- Commissioned: June 23, 1967
- Decommissioned: December 8, 2021

General characteristics
- Class & type: Orlik-class minesweeper, projekt 206FM-class minehunter
- Displacement: standard: 426 t (419 long tons); full: 470 t (460 long tons)
- Length: 58.2 m (190 ft 11 in)
- Draft: 214 m (702 ft 1 in)
- Propulsion: 2 FIAT 2312 SS diesel engines with a total power of 2,648 kW (3,600 hp); 2 propellers
- Speed: 18.4 kn (34.1 km/h; 21.2 mph)
- Range: 2,000 nautical miles at a speed of 17 kn (31 km/h; 20 mph)
- Complement: 49
- Sensors & processing systems: Tamir-11M sonar; Lin-M radar; Kremnij-2 identification friend or foe system; ARP-50-1.2M radio direction finder
- Armament: 6 cannons caliber 25 mm 2M-3M (3 x II); 2 depth charge launchers, 10–16 naval mines

ORP Czajka is a Polish base minesweeper from the Cold War era, one of a series of 12 vessels of Orlik-class, converted between 1998 and 1999 to a minehunter of Projekt 206FM. The unit measured 58.2 meters in length, 7.97 meters in width, and had a draft of 2.14 meters, with a full displacement of 470 tons. It was armed with three double sets of 25 mm 2M-3M autocannons and depth charges, and was also adapted for transporting and deploying naval mines.

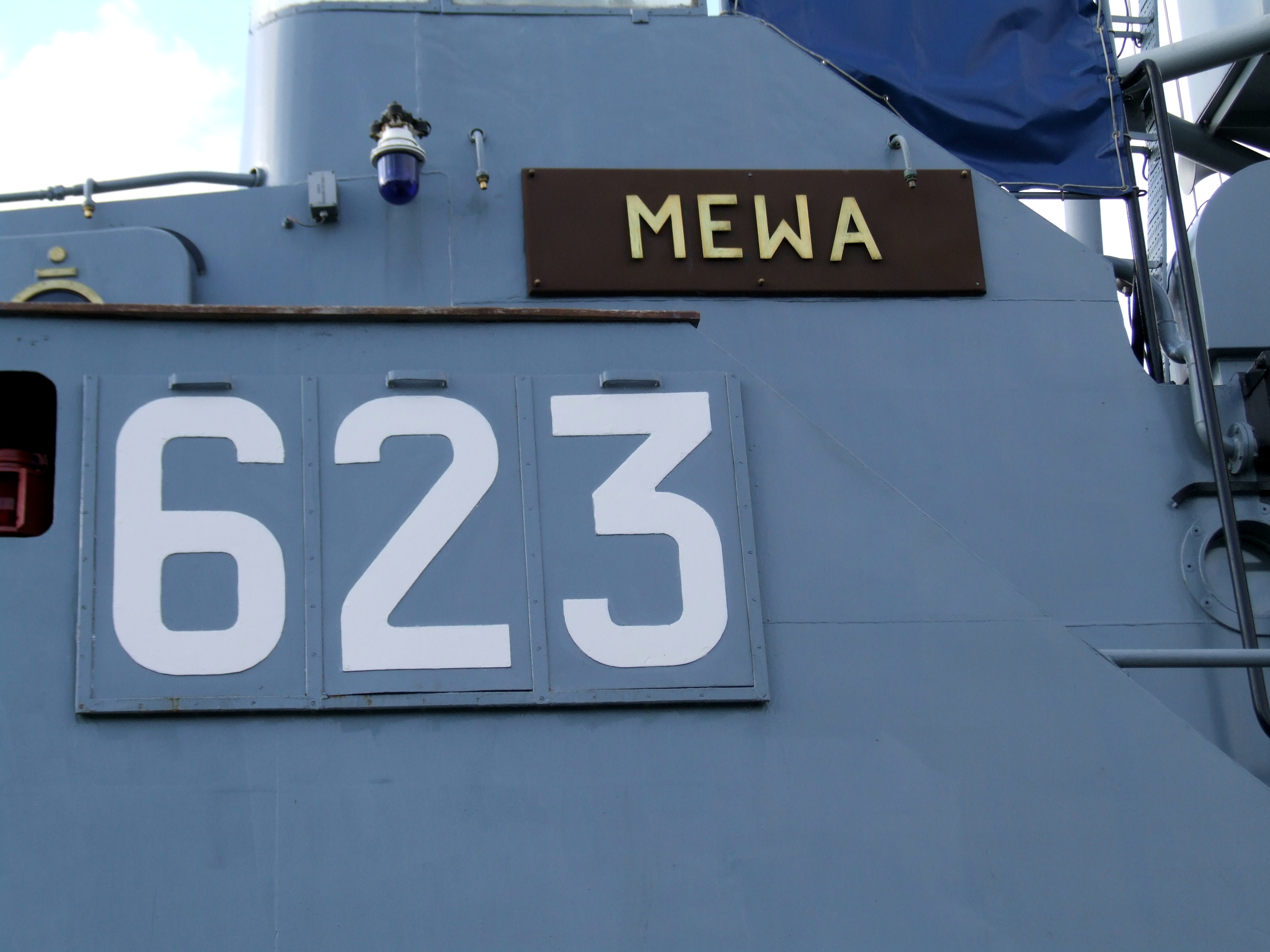
Pennant number on the superstructure (after conversion)

It was launched on 17 December 1966 at Stocznia Gdynia, and it was commissioned into the Polish Navy on 23 June 1967. The heavily utilized unit, designated with the pennant number 624, initially served in the 13th Minesweeper Division of the 9th Coastal Defense Flotilla in Hel, and after its dissolution in 2006, it was assigned to the 8th Coastal Defence Flotilla. ORP Czajka was part of the NATO mine countermeasures task forces four times and participated in numerous international maneuvers and exercises, clearing dangerous remnants of World War II from Polish and foreign waters. The ship was decommissioned in December 2021.

== Design and construction ==
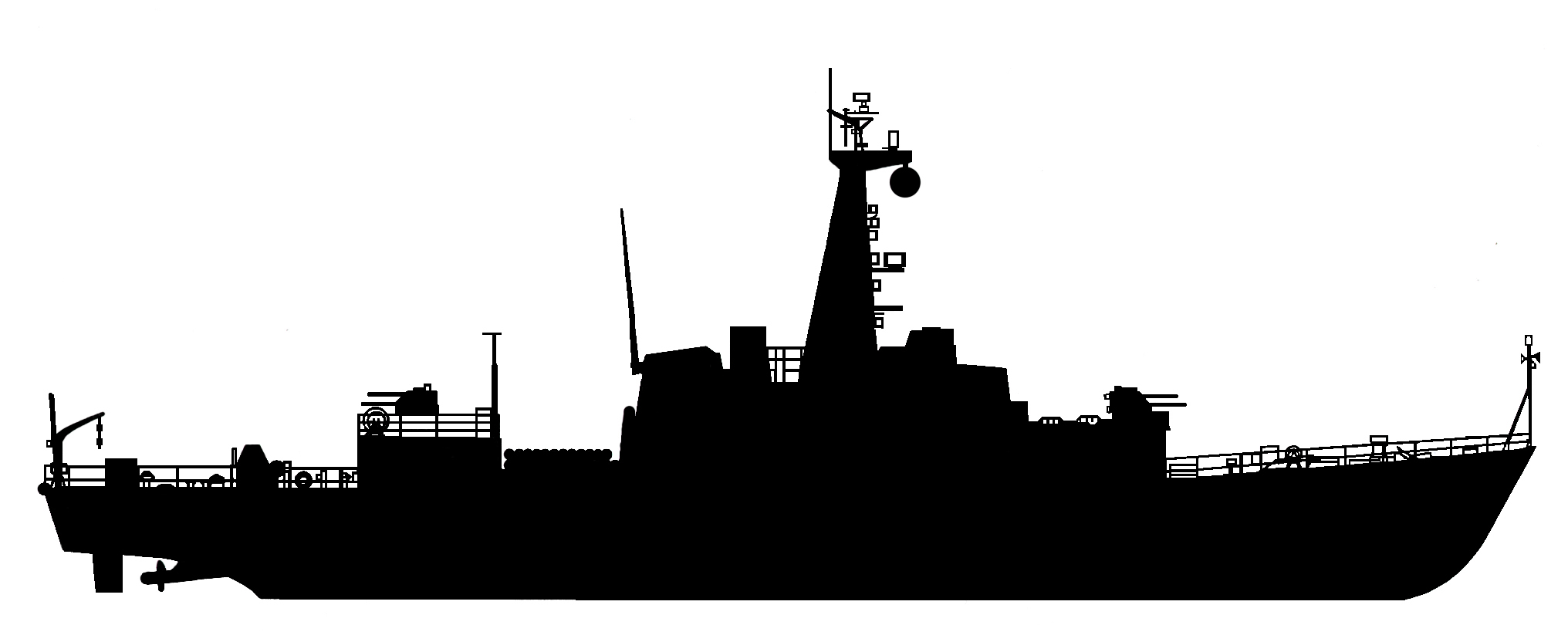
Silhouette of the Projekt 206F minesweeper

Work on a new type of minesweeper began at the Central Ship Design Bureau No. 2 in Gdańsk in 1958 to replace the Projekt 253Ł minesweepers, which had been in service since 1946. Initially, the new vessels were intended to be roadstead minesweepers, capable of conducting both contact and non-contact mine clearance operations in the vicinity of naval bases and laying small minefields. These ships were to have a displacement of approximately 200 tons, a speed of 18 knots, a range of 3,000 nautical miles, and armament consisting of two 45 mm guns and four 14.5 mm heavy machine guns, with mine clearance equipment standard for the late 1950s. Simultaneously, the Navy Command issued requirements for a new base minesweeper with a displacement of 570 tons, despite ongoing preparations for the licensed production of Soviet T43-class minesweepers. Under the leadership of engineer Henryk Andrzejewski, Central Ship Design Bureau No. 2 prepared both the design for a roadstead minesweeper (designated Projekt 206) and four designs for larger base minesweepers (Projekts 250–253). After much debate, it was decided to halt work on the Projekt 250–253 base minesweepers in favor of converting the Projekt 206 vessel into a base minesweeper. In 1959, Central Ship Design Bureau No. 2 developed a modified minesweeper design with a displacement of 425 tons, powered by Italian Fiat diesel engines, as no suitable propulsion units were being produced in socialist countries. (Note: Initially, it was planned to use Dutch RHUB 215 diesel engines with a power of 1,500 hp to power the minesweepers; however, a license could not be obtained for them (similarly to the Fiat engines, of which 24 units were ultimately purchased for a total of 2.4 million USD) (Kamiński (2008a, pp. 25–27)).) The project (designated B206F) (Note: The letter F in the project designation likely symbolizes the Fiat engines used to power the minesweepers (Ciślak (1995, p. 91)).) was approved for implementation in December 1959 by the Minister of National Defense, but the final technical design was not approved by the Navy Command until 19 February 1962. The documentation costs amounted to 1.7 million PLN, the construction of the prototype (the future Orlik) cost 80 million PLN, and the cost of a serial ship was 65.5 million PLN. The unit's annual operational limit was set at 700 hours, with the structure's lifespan estimated at 20 years.

ORP Czajka was built at Stocznia Gdynia (yard number 206F/12). Military oversight of the construction was carried out by Lieutenant Commander Konstanty Cudny. The shipyard used a method of building the vessel's hull from sections joined on the slipway, a technique previously developed for the mass production of fishing trawlers. The keel of the ship was laid on 12 September 1966, and it was launched on 17 December 1966. The minesweeper was given the traditional name for Polish mine warfare vessels, taken from a bird. The ship's godmother was the wife of one of the builders, Kazimiera Prządak.

== Tactical and technical data ==
The ship was a smooth-deck, ocean-going minesweeper designed for operation in conditions of partial ice cover. The overall length was 58.2 meters, width was 7.97 meters, and draft was 2.14 meters. The side height measured 4 meters. Constructed from steel, the vessel's fully welded hull was reinforced to increase resistance to underwater explosions. It was divided into seven watertight compartments: (from the bow): I – forecastle (bosun's store, ship's equipment store, food store, chain locker, and anchor windlass), II – radar station and ammunition and electrical storage, III – living quarters and gyrocompass and artillery central room, IV – auxiliary engine room, V – main engine room with propulsion control center, VI – stern crew quarters, and VII – minesweeping equipment store, steering engine, and depth charge chutes. The lowest level of the hull housed fuel tanks, freshwater, and service water tanks, as well as the propeller shafts. On the lower level of the superstructure were the officers' cabins, mess, galley, sanitary facilities, and food storage. The upper part contained the bridge and cabins for radio, navigation, and sonar, along with a command post on the signal deck covered with a tarpaulin roof and a light three-legged mast with radio equipment antennas. The standard displacement was 426 tons, while the full displacement was 470 tons. (Note: Gardiner & Chumbley (1996, p. 316) report a standard displacement of 424 tons and a full displacement of 503 tons, while Piwowoński (1989, p. 336) states that the displacement was 450/483 tons.)

The ship was powered by two non-reversible, turbocharged 12-cylinder four-stroke diesel engines in a V configuration, the FIAT 2312SS, each with a maximum power of 1,324 kW (1,800 hp; the nominal power was 1,400 hp at 920 rpm), driving two controllable pitch propellers via Lohman GUB reduction gears. The maximum speed of the vessel was 18.4 knots (economical speed – 17 knots). The ship could carry 55.5 tons of fuel, providing a range of 2,000 nautical miles at a speed of 17 knots. (Note: Kamiński (2008a, p. 26) and Koszela (2017, p. 122) state that the range was 2,000 nautical miles at a speed of 15 knots, while Piwowoński (1989, p. 336) claims it was 3,200 nautical miles at 12 knots.) At the stern, there were two balanced rudders, each with an area of 1.7 m², operated by an MS25 steering gear. Electrical power was supplied by four British main generators, Ruston S324M, each rated at 60 kVA (consisting of a generator and a Leyland SW400 engine with a power of 72 hp at 1,500 rpm), an auxiliary generator S322M rated at 27 kVA, and an electromagnetic minesweeping generator M50. The ship's autonomy was 12 days. It could safely operate in sea state 8, while performing minesweeping tasks in sea state 4, at speeds ranging from 0 to 12 knots.

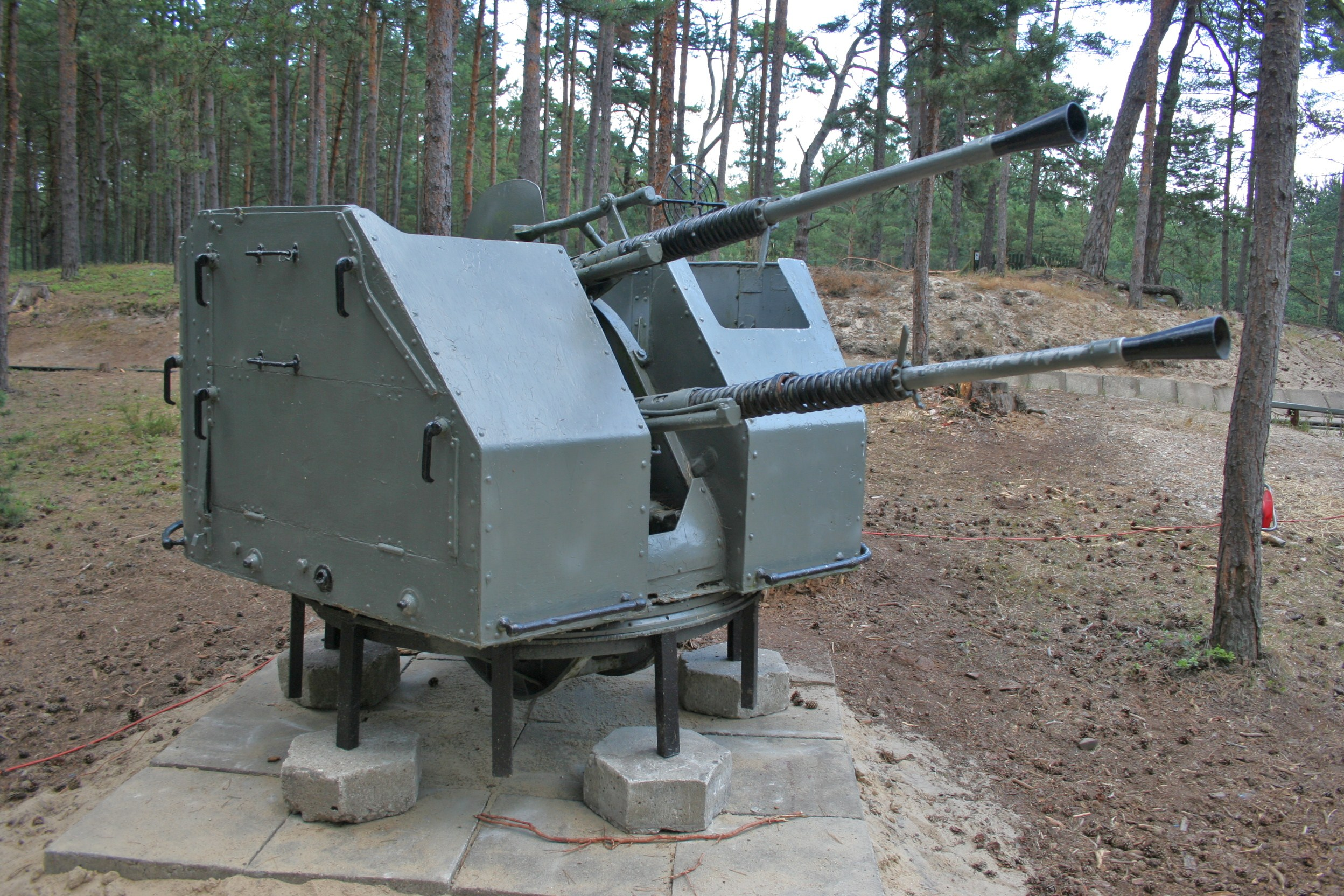
2M-3M 25 mm artillery system

The ship's initial artillery armament consisted of three twin 2M-3M 25 mm autocannons, with a total ammunition supply of 6,000 rounds. These were positioned with one mount forward of the superstructure along the ship's centerline and two mounts side by side on the aft superstructure. The anti-submarine warfare armament included two below-deck depth charge racks, with a total of 12 B-1 depth charges. Additionally, the ship was equipped with two deck-mounted mine rails, capable of alternately carrying 10 KB or AMD-500 mines, 16 08/39 mines, or 8 AMD-1000 mines. The crew was also armed with individual weapons, including 22 AK-47 rifles and 8 pistols, with a total ammunition stock of 17,000 rounds.

Minesweeping equipment included the MT-2 contact sweep, TEM-52M electromagnetic sweep, and BAT-2 acoustic sweep. The ship's electronic equipment included the Kremnij-2 identification friend or foe system, R-609 VHF radio communication station, R-644 HF transmitter, R-671 HF receiver, R-619 wideband receiver, ARP-50-1,2M direction finder, Tamir-11M (MG-11M) sonar, Lin-M general observation radar, and Rym-K radio navigation system. The ship was also equipped with 8 smoke candle racks, a Kurs-4 gyrocompass, UKPM-1M and UKPM-3M magnetic compasses, a NEŁ-5 echo sounder, MGŁ-25 chip log, and an infrared group navigation system called Chmiel.

The minesweeper was adapted for passive defense against nuclear and chemical threats. For this purpose, three rooms with filtration and ventilation devices were constructed, and dosimetric equipment, as well as decontamination spray pipelines, were installed on the ship. Degaussing equipment further supplemented the vessel's systems.

The ship's crew initially consisted of 49 personnel – 5 officers, 16 non-commissioned officers, and 28 sailors.

== Service ==
=== Service as a minesweeper (1967–1998) ===
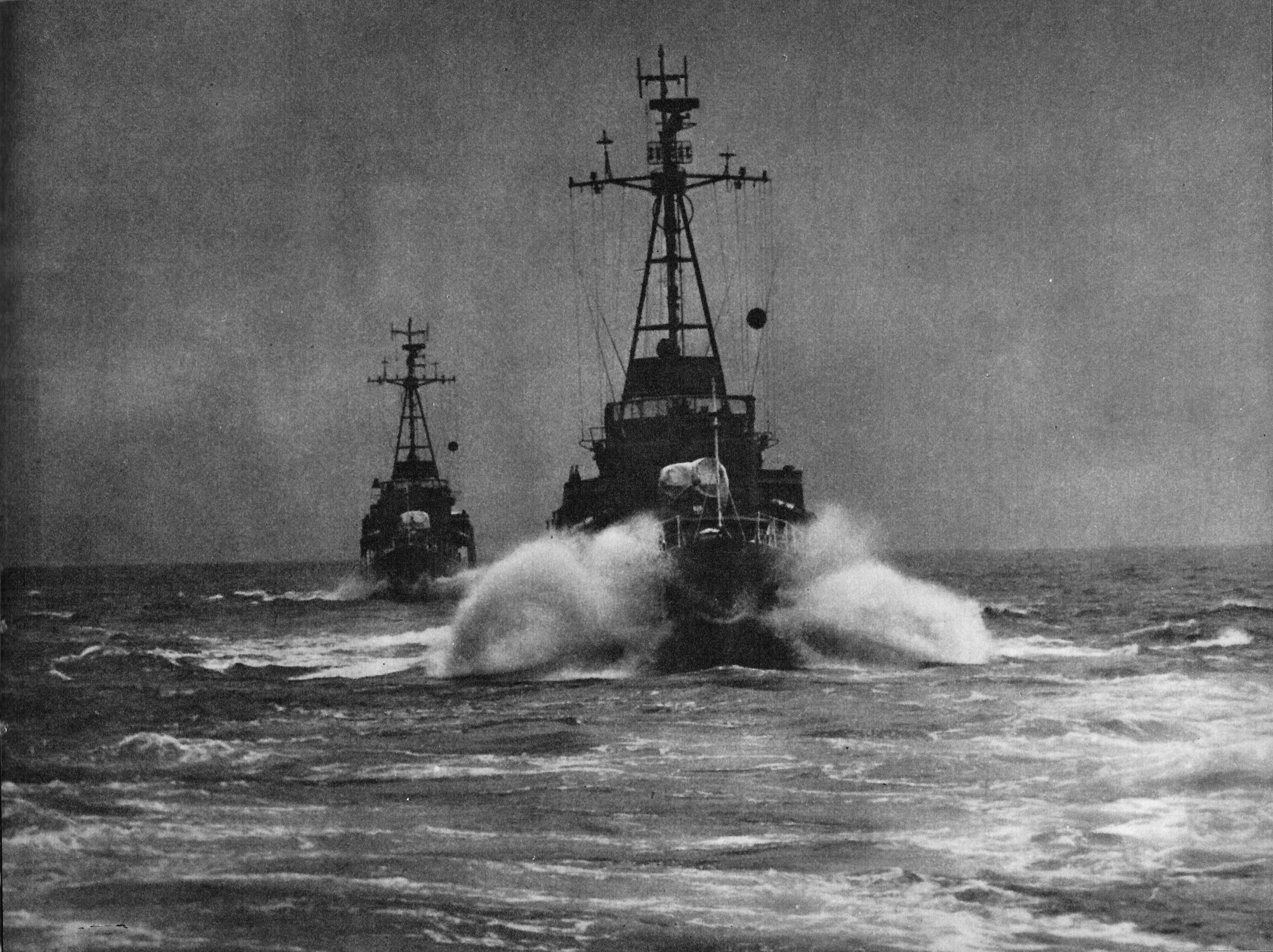
Projekt 206F minesweepers at sea

On 23 June 1967, ORP Czajka was commissioned into the Polish Navy under the order of the Navy Commander No. 033/org. dated June 17 of that year. (Note: Kamiński (2008a, p. 29) states that the commissioning took place on 26 june 1967.) The vessel, marked with the penannt number 624, joined the 13th Minesweeper Division of the 9th Coastal Defense Flotilla, stationed in Hel. The ship's tasks included searching for and destroying minefields, conducting reconnaissance and control sweeping, marking navigation routes, and guiding vessels or their groups along those routes. Along with its sister ships, Czajka participated in nearly all significant exercises of Polish vessels and the Warsaw Pact fleets, frequently engaging in the disposal of unexploded ordnance from World War II.

In the early 1970s, ORP Czajka belonged to the IV group of the 13th Minesweeper Division (alongside Rybitwa and Mewa). From 1970 to 1974, the vessel participated in mine searching in the area designated for the construction of the Northern Port in Gdańsk. In June 1975, due to the introduction of a new numbering system by the Polish Navy, the vessel's pennant number was changed to 654. In that month, the minesweeper took part in the Polish Navy exercises codenamed Posejdon-75. In mid-1976, the vessel underwent another renumbering, receiving the number 679. It returned to its original designation (624) in mid-1978. On 24 November 1978, Czajka was awarded the title of the best ship of the Polish Navy in its class. In the late 1970s, the vessel was tested multiple times with prototypes of the ZU-23-2M Wróbel artillery system, but in the early 1980s, the minesweeper was equipped with this type of weapon (which was soon removed and replaced with older 2M-3M systems due to high failure rates). In 1985, the ship participated in exercises codenamed Reda-85 and Barakuda-85. In 1987, Czajka took part in mine clearance operations near Świnoujście.

From 6 to 18 June 1995, the unit (alongside its sister ships ORP Tukan, Flaming, and Mewa, the submarine Wilk, and the missile ships Hutnik and Metalowiec) participated in the NATO naval forces international exercise BALTOPS ’95. From 2 to 14 October 1995, the vessel took part in mine countermeasure exercises organized by the Belgian Navy (alongside the minesweepers Mewa and Rybitwa and the tanker Bałtyk). From 14 to 16 September 1996, ORP Czajka, along with the mine destroyers: Belgian Lobelia and Primula, Dutch Zierikzee, and Polish minesweepers Flaming, Mewa, and Śniardwy, participated in searching for and destroying mines in the shipping lanes of the Gdańsk Bay.

During its long service, the ship's electronic equipment was modernized: the Lin-M radar was replaced with a newer TRN-823, the Kremnij-2 identification friend or foe was replaced with Nichrom-RR, and a second SRN-2061 radar station was added. The outdated Rym-K radionavigation system was also removed and replaced with a more modern Bras system (with the Hals receiver); British Decca Pirs-1M radionavigation receivers were also installed. In the early 1980s, the ship's anti-aircraft armament was enhanced by installing two quadruple Fasta-4M launchers for 9K32 Strela-2 anti-aircraft missiles (with a total of 16 missiles) on both sides of the funnel. Changes also affected the sweeping equipment: the MT-2 contact sweep was upgraded to the MT-2W variant (with explosive cutters), and new Polish electromagnetic sweep TEM-PE-2 and deep-water, high-speed acoustic sweep BGAT were installed.

=== Conversion to a minehunter ===
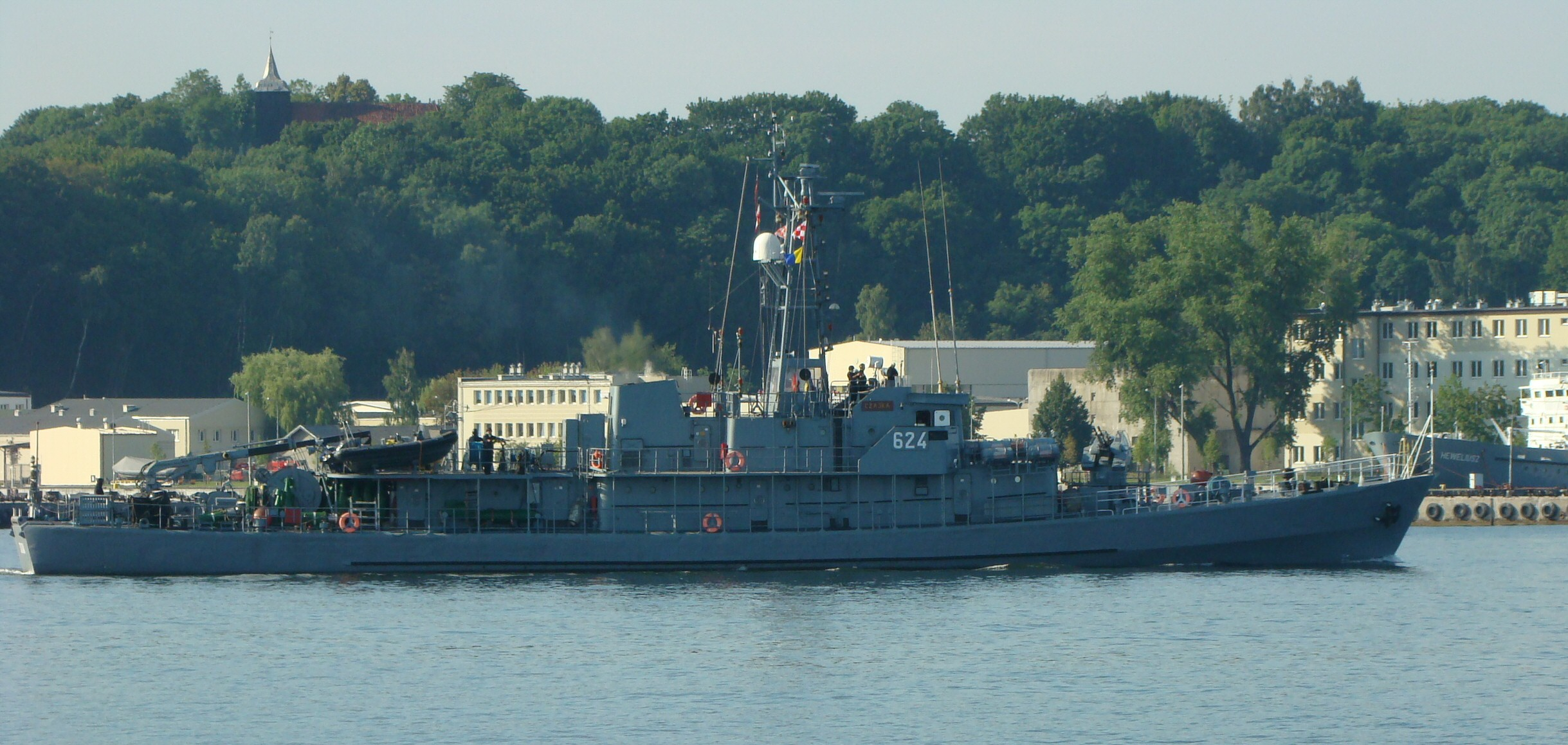
Czajka after reconstruction (2017)

By the end of 1998, ORP Czajka was decommissioned and underwent conversion to a Projekt 206FM-class minehunter, a process that lasted until 2000. The modernization design was developed and executed at the Polish Navy Shipyard in Gdynia. The overhaul included modifications to most compartments and the internal structure of the hull, which was divided into 10 watertight compartments. Some plating was replaced, and the vessel received an entirely new, larger superstructure, funnel, and tripod mast. The superstructure now housed the main command post, as well as a two-compartment diving chamber manufactured by the Szczecin company Aquaticus, designated for the new crew members – divers.

The original three 25 mm gun emplacements were replaced with a single ZU-23-2MR Wróbel II rocket-artillery system with dual 23 mm cannons, while the two quadruple launchers for 9K32 Strela-2 missiles were retained, and the vessel was stripped of its depth charge racks. The ship's mine rails were adapted to carry alternatively: 12 OS mines, 12 MMD-1 mines, 12 MMD-2 mines, or 6 OD mines. The mine countermeasure equipment was also upgraded to include, in addition to the MT-2W contact sweep (equipped with Bofors explosive cutters), an electromagnetic sweep TEM-PE-2MA, an acoustic sweep MTA-2, and two Ukwiał underwater vehicles (designed and built at the Gdańsk University of Technology).

The electronic equipment was also upgraded, now consisting of the Pstrokosz command support system, a Decca Bridge Master navigation radar, an SHL-100MA sonar, a towed SHL-200 Flaming B sonar, the Jemiołuszka precise navigation system, and the Supraśl identification friend-or-foe system. Additional installations included: the FIN Skog electronic navigational chart set, HF and UHF fibre optic gyrocompasses by Rohde & Schwarz, a C.Plath fiber-optic gyrocompass, a STN Atlas Doppler log, and the MORS shipwide broadcast system. Additionally, a set of six WNP81/9 Jastrząb decoy launchers was installed, and the worn FIAT engines were replaced with six-cylinder Cegielski-Sulzer 6AL25/30 diesel engines, each with a maximum output of 1,700 hp (nominally 1,100 hp at 750 rpm). New generator sets were also installed.

A key environmental protection upgrade included the installation of a new sewage treatment plant, recovery oil and oily water tanks, and a seawater desalination unit. The addition of new equipment increased the full displacement to 507 tons and raised the crew size to 54. (Note: Krzewiński (2014, p. 68) states that the full displacement increased to 559 tons.) The cost of the ship's modernization amounted to approximately 38 million PLN.

=== Service as a minehunter (2000–2021) ===
On 26 May 2000, ORP Czajka was recommissioned in the Naval Port in Hel. In July of that year, the modernized Czajka was presented at the world exhibition Expo 2000 in Hanover. From 6 to 7 July 2000, the vessel participated in Polish-German mine countermeasure exercises in the Bay of Kiel (alongside the minesweepers Wigry, Gopło, the rescue boat Gniewko, and the tanker Z-8).

From April 21 to 12 May 2001, Czajka, along with Mewa, as part of the Mine Counter Measure Forces North (MCMForNorth), took part in the Blue Game 2001 exercises in the Danish Straits. From 21 to 25 May, the vessel participated in the mine countermeasure exercises Squadex, which included Polish ships (ORP Mewa, Gopło, and Wdzydze) as well as the German minesweeper Laboe, the Estonian ships Wambola and Admiral Pitka, and the Latvian ship Viesturs. Between 4 and 19 September, ORP Czajka and Śniardwy participated in the Open Spirit 2001 exercises in the Gulf of Finland, where they searched for mines and other hazards near the approaches to the port of Tallinn. From 24 to 30 October, Czajka, along with its twin ship Flaming, joined the Passex international exercises. In 2001, under the command of Lieutenant Aleksander Gierkowski, Czajka was awarded as the best ship of the 9th Coastal Defense Flotilla and the best combat ship of the Polish Navy in the over-400-ton displacement category. In October and November, the navy's mine countermeasure team (ORP Czajka, Flaming, Mielno, Resko, Drużno, Wigry, and Śniardwy) cleared hazardous elements from the marine range between Ustka and Wicko Morskie in preparation for NATO's Strong Resolve 2002 exercises.

From 1 to 15 March 2002, NATO's Strong Resolve 2002 naval exercises took place in Poland and Norway, involving over 100 ships. The Polish Navy deployed 14 ships, including ORP Czajka, Orzeł, Lech, Gniezno, Poznań, Orkan, Metalowiec, Rolnik, Flaming, Mewa, Semko, Kaszub, Zawzięty, and Zwinny. From April 22 to May 10, Czajka (under the command of Lieutenant Krzysztof Rybak) and Flaming participated in the Blue Game 2002 exercises in the Danish straits. Between 18 and 26 October, ORP Czajka and Mewa joined the Open Spirit 2002 mine countermeasure exercises in the Gulf of Riga, where the crew of Czajka destroyed two German mines weighing 480 kg each. From 25 to 30 November, these ships, along with Flaming, participated in the Passex exercises in Polish waters.

On 13 February 2003, the minehunter crew retrieved a German G7e torpedo from the bottom of the Gdańsk Bay near Gdynia, which was later detonated on a marine range. On April 23, Czajka joined the NATO Mine Counter Measure Forces North (MCMForNorth), becoming the second Polish vessel (after Mewa) to participate, completing its mission on July 10. From April 28 to May 16, the ship, along with Mewa and the landing ship Poznań, participated in Blue Game 2003 exercises in the Danish straits and the southern Baltic. ORP Czajka also represented the Polish Navy in the following edition of these international exercises from April 27 to 13 May 2004. Between August 14 and 13 October 2004, the vessel once again served on standby with MCMForNorth, participating in mine countermeasure operations off the coast of Lithuania in Open Spirit 2004 and in international Passex exercises.

On 22 March 2005, the vessel assisted in retrieving a 533 mm torpedo from the Gdańsk Bay near the Fisherman’s Settlement. In May, ORP Czajka served as the flagship for the MCM Sqnex mine countermeasure exercises on the Baltic Sea, involving 14 ships from seven NATO countries, with Poland represented by ORP Czajka, Flaming, Gopło, and Śniardwy.

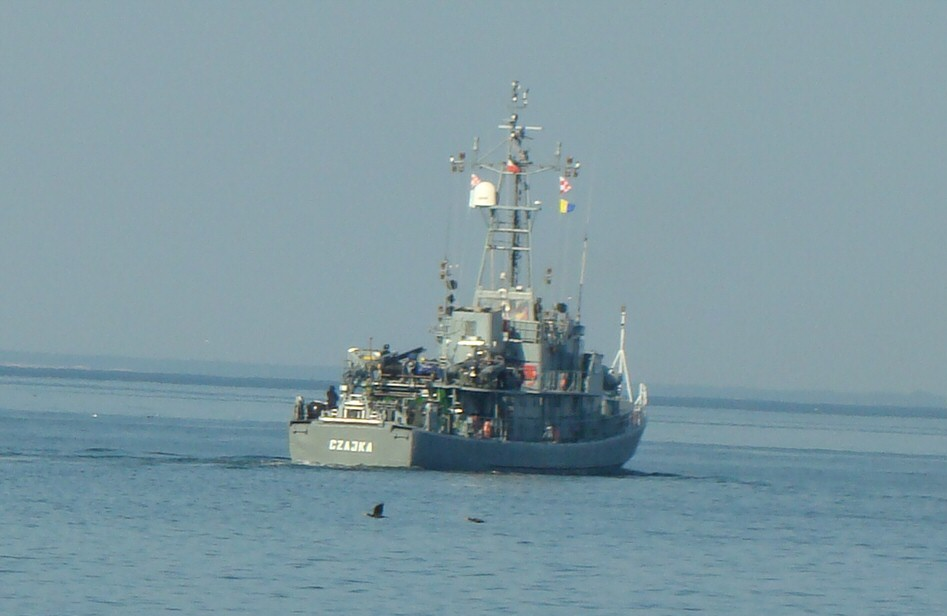
Czajka in 2017

At the turn of 2005 and 2006, the Jastrząb decoy launchers were dismantled from the vessel. In June 2006, with the disbanding of the 9th Coastal Defense Flotilla, Czajka and the entire 13th Minesweeper Squadron were transferred to Gdynia, becoming part of the 8th Coastal Defense Flotilla from that point forward. From 4 to 12 September 2006, the unit, along with the twin vessel Flaming, participated in the international Open Spirit 2006 exercises held in the waters of the Gulf of Finland.

In 2007, the automatic identification system was installed on the ship. On May 2, Czajka's crew destroyed a German mine with an explosive payload of around 750 kg, which had been recovered the previous day by ORP Zbyszko and a diving team from the seabed in Gdańsk’s Nowy Port. From 14 to 24 May, the vessel took part in the large-scale NATO naval exercise Noble Mariner '07, conducted in the waters of the Baltic Sea, the Danish straits, and the North Sea. The Polish naval contingent in addition to Czajka included the missile frigate Generał Tadeusz Kościuszko, the submarine Kondor, the rescue ship Piast, the minesweepers Necko, Drużno, and Resko, the rescue cutter Zbyszko, and the tug H-8. On 30 July 2007, under the command of Captain Lieutenant Jarosław Tuszkowski, the vessel commenced a 2.5-month mission as part of the Standing NATO Mine Countermeasures Group (SNMCMG1), concluding on October 16. Between August 31 and September 10, Czajka and Mewa participated in international mine countermeasure exercises Open Spirit 2007, held in the waters of the Baltic states.

From 4 to 14 May 2008, Czajka took part in the international MCOPLIT operation (Mine Clearance Operation Lithuania) to clear unexploded ordnance off the coast of Lithuania. From 19 to 23 May 2008, Czajka, Flaming, and Gopło participated in Passex exercises in the Gdańsk Bay. Between 1 and 12 September, the vessel joined the international mine countermeasure exercises Open Spirit 2008 in the waters of the Gulf of Riga, destroying five mines (three moored and two ground mines) and a torpedo. In the latter half of September, the unit took part in the Polish Armed Forces’ largest annual exercises, Anakonda 2008.

In 2009, the vessel underwent an overhaul lasting over a year. In July 2010, Czajka took part in SNMCMG1 exercises Danex held in Danish waters. On 27 September 2010, the 13th Minesweeper Squadron, including Czajka, was subordinated to the command of the 3rd Ship Flotilla.

From 23 to 27 May 2011, Czajka participated in the maritime component of the Polish Armed Forces exercise Rekin 2011, alongside Kondor, Gen. T. Kościuszko, Orkan, Piorun, Sarbsko, Nakło, Drużno, Śniardwy, Mewa, Lublin, Poznań, Toruń, Piast, Zbyszko, Bałtyk, Hydrograf, and Arctowski. On November 24, the vessel’s crew retrieved two torpedoes from the seabed in the Gdańsk Bay near Gdynia, which were detonated at a maritime testing range.

From 11 to 25 May 2012, the vessel participated in another edition of the Open Spirit exercises off the coast of Estonia, neutralizing two Russian mines. In September, Czajka, Mewa, Sokół, Gopło, Śniardwy, Lech, Maćko, Hydrograf, Arctowski, H-7, H-8, Poznań, Toruń, Gardno, Bukowo, Jamno, Mielno, and Nakło took part in the Polish Armed Forces’ largest annual exercises, Anakonda 12.

From 17 January to 5 May 2013, Czajka operated in the waters of the Baltic Sea, the North Sea, and the Irish Sea as part of SNMCMG1 for the fourth time, participating in Beneficial Cooperation in the North Sea and Joint Warrior off the coast of Scotland. On June 30, Czajka took part in a naval parade in Gdynia to commemorate the 95th anniversary of the Polish Navy. From 6 to 19 September, the vessel participated in Northern Coast exercises off the coast of Sweden, and from October 28 to November 8, it joined the Steadfast Jazz exercises. On November 1, ORP Czajka and the entire 13th Minesweeper Squadron were reassigned to the 8th Coastal Defense Flotilla.

In 2014, Czajka underwent an extended refit at Gdańsk’s Remontowa shipyard and the Polish Navy Shipyard in Gdynia, completed only on 3 March 2016. In June 2016, the vessel, along with 11 other ships, participated in the maritime component of the Polish Armed Forces’ premier exercise, Anakonda 2016.

On 17 June 2017, the ship celebrated its 50th anniversary of service in the Polish Navy. In August, Czajka participated in the Open Spirit 2017 operation off the coast of the Baltic states. From 11 to 13 October 2018, the vessel took part in neutralizing three German GC-type mines near the port entrance in Gdynia. At the end of October, the unit joined the Northern Coast 2018 exercises in Finnish waters.

From 2 to 17 May 2019, under the command of Captain Lieutenant Piotr Gorycki, Czajka participated in Open Spirit 2019 off the coast of Latvia. Under the command of Captain Lieutenant Kacper Sterne, the vessel also joined the 26th edition of these exercises, held from 19 to 29 April 2021 in the waters of the Gulf of Finland and the Narva Bay, where the crew located 20 moored mines, destroying six Soviet M-26 non-contact mines. In August, Czajka participated in the OCEAN (Open Cooperation for European Maritime Awareness) 2020 exercises off the coast of Sweden.

By order of the Armed Forces General Command, number 527 of December 2, the ship’s flag was lowered for the last time on 8 December 2021, after more than 54 years of service in the Polish Navy at the Polish Navy Port in Gdynia.

== Ship commanders ==
Sources:

- 17 June 1967 – 11 December 1969 – Captain Lieutenant Leopold Balas
- 12 December 1968 – 6 April 1971 – Lieutenant Roman Mańko
- 7 April 1971 – 28 August 1975 – Lieutenant Waldemar Warszewski
- 29 August 1975 – 4 November 1975 – Lieutenant Czesław Mikołajew
- 4 November 1975 – 8 September 1977 – Lieutenant Mieczysław Waryszczak
- 8 September 1977 – 1 December 1979 – Lieutenant Andrzej Ślosarczyk
- 1 December 1979 – 6 April 1981 – Lieutenant Jan Kanturski
- 6 April 1981 – 1 March 1982 – Lieutenant Jerzy Karpiński
- 1 March 1982 – 11 August 1984 – Lieutenant Mirosław Oniszczuk
- 11 August 1984 – 23 December 1985 – Lieutenant Grzegorz Skowroński
- 23 December 1985 – 12 February 1988 – Lieutenant Włodzimierz Pacek
- 12 February 1988 – 2 January 1991 – Lieutenant Józef Kaczmarski
- 2 January 1991 – 16 September 1991 – Lieutenant Bogdan Kasprowicz
- 14 July 1992 – 21 January 1994 – Captain Lieutenant Janusz Mrugała
- 21 January 1994 – 27 October 1998 – Lieutenant Wiesław Puchalski
- 27 October 1998 – 1 January 2002 – Captain Lieutenant Aleksander Gierkowski
- 1 January 2002 – 20 August 2003 – Captain Lieutenant Krzysztof Rybak
- 20 August 2003 – 1 July 2004 – Captain Lieutenant Piotr Sikora
- 1 July 2004 – 1 February 2010 – Captain Lieutenant Jarosław Tuszkowski
- 1 February 2010 – 30 June 2015 – Captain Lieutenant Piotr Pasztelan
- 1 July 2015 – 18 July 2016 – Captain Lieutenant Tomasz Zuber
- 1 August 2016 – 19 September 2019 – Captain Lieutenant Piotr Gorycki
- 19 September 2019 – ? Captain Lieutenant Kacper Sterne
- ? – 8 December 2021 – Captain Lieutenant Wojciech Zaleski

== Bibliography ==
- Ciślak, Jarosław (2000). "ORP Czajka ponownie w służbie" [ORP Czajka Back in Service]. Nowa Technika Wojskowa (in Polish). 7. Magnum-X. ISSN 1230-1655.
- Ciślak, Jarosław (1995). Polska Marynarka Wojenna 1995: okręty, samoloty i śmigłowce, uzbrojenie, organizacja [Polish Navy 1995: ships, airplanes and helicopters, armament, organization] (in Polish) (I ed.). Warsaw: Lampart & Bellona. ISBN 83-86776-08-0.
- Gardiner, Robert; Chumbley, Stephen, eds. (1996). Conway's All The World's Fighting Ships 1947-1995. Annapolis: Naval Institute Press. ISBN 1-55750-132-7.
- Kamiński, Jerzy M. (2008). "Współczesne "ptaszki" czyli historia projektu 206" [Modern "Birdies" or the history of Project 206]. Morze, Statki i Okręty (in Polish). 9 (81). Magnum-X. ISSN 1426-529X.
- Kamiński, Jerzy M. (2008). "Na drodze do pierwszego polskiego niszczyciela min. Okręty projektu 206FM" [On the road to the first Polish minesweeper: Project 206FM ships]. Morze, Statki i Okręty (in Polish). 11 (83). Magnum-X. ISSN 1426-529X.
- Koszela, Witold (2017). Okręty Floty Polskiej [Ships of the Polish Fleet] (in Polish). Vol. II. Oświęcim: Napoleon V. ISBN 978-83-65746-68-9.
- Krzewiński, Jacek (2014). "Niszczyciele min projektu 206FM" [Project 206FM minesweepers]. Okręty (in Polish). 1 (31). KAGERO. ISSN 1898-1518.
- Pater, Walter (1994). "Polskie trałowce typu Orlik (proj. "206F")" [Polish Orlik-class trawlers (proj. "206F")]. Okręty Wojenne (in Polish). 11. Tarnowskie Góry. ISSN 1231-014X.
- Pietlewannyj, M. B. (2009). Korabli stran Warszawskogo dogowora Корабли стран Варшавского договора [Ships of the Warsaw Pact countries] (in Russian). Saint Petersburg: Galeja Print. ISBN 978-5-8172-0127-7.
- Piwowoński, Jan (1989). Flota spod biało-czerwonej [The fleet under the white and red] (in Polish). Warsaw: Nasza Księgarnia. ISBN 83-10-08902-3.
- 13 dywizjon Trałowców im. admirała floty Andrzeja Karwety 1930–2020 [13th Mine Countermeasures Squadron Named After Admiral of the Fleet Andrzej Karweta 1930–2020] (in Polish). Warsaw: Wojskowe Centrum Edukacji Obywatelskiej. 2020. ISBN 978-83-66447-14-1.
- Rochowicz, Robert (2020). "Narcyz – system zmiennych numerów burtowych" [Narcyz – system of variable hull numbers]. Morze, Statki i Okręty (in Polish). 11–12 (201). Magnum-X. ISSN 1426-529X.
- Serafin, Mieczysław (2008). Polska Marynarka Wojenna 1945-2007. Kronika wydarzeń [Polish Navy 1945–2007: A Chronicle of Events] (in Polish). Gdynia: Zespół Redakcyjno-Wydawniczy Marynarki Wojennej. ISBN 978-83-88698-03-3.
- Sołkiewicz, Henryk, ed. (2015). Ewolucyjny rozwój sił okrętowych Marynarki Wojennej w latach 1945–2010 [The Evolutionary Development of the Naval Forces of the Polish Navy in 1945–2010] (in Polish). Gdynia: Wydawnictwo BP/Akademia Marynarki Wojennej. ISBN 978-83-941308-4-8.
