= Piorun =

Piorun can refer to:

- ORP Piorun, Polish Navy destroyer in World War II
- Piorun (missile), Polish MANPADS
- Krzysztof Mikołaj "Piorun" Radziwiłł, a 16th-century Polish nobleman
- Polish name for the Slavic thunder god, Perun
- Kacper Piorun, Polish chess player
