= ORP Grom =

Three ships of the Polish Navy have been named ORP Grom (Polish: thunder):

- ORP Grom (1936) was a Grom-class destroyer launched in 1936 and sunk near Narvik in 1940.
- ORP Grom (1957) was a Project 30bis destroyer received from the USSR in 1957 and decommissioned in 1973.
- ORP Grom (1995) is an Orkan-class fast attack craft launched in 1995 and currently serving with the Polish Navy.
