= ORP Piorun =

Two ships of the Polish Navy have been named ORP Piorun (Polish: lightning):

- ORP Piorun (G65), an N-class destroyer (formerly HMS Nerissa) transferred to the free Polish Navy based in Britain in October 1940. During the war she saw several engagements with U-boats and took part in the final battle of Bismarck. She was transferred back to the Royal Navy after the end of the war.
- ORP Piorun (1994), an Orkan-class fast attack craft built in the German Democratic Republic for its navy and originally named Project 660. After German reunification the unfinished hulls were bought by the Polish Navy and completed by Northern Shipyard in Gdańsk. Piorun is currently in service.
