= ORP Orkan =

Three ships of the Polish Navy have been named ORP Orkan (Polish: windstorm):

- Orkan was the planned name for the second improved Grom-class destroyer. She was never laid down; the German invasion of Poland on 1 September 1939 interrupted her construction and the materials intended for her construction were scrapped or diverted.
- ORP Orkan (G90), an M-class destroyer (formerly HMS Myrmidon) transferred to the free Polish Navy based in Britain in December 1942. She was sunk by U-378 on 8 October 1943 in the Barents Sea.
- ORP Orkan (1992), an Orkan-class fast attack craft built in the German Democratic Republic for its navy and originally named Project 660. After German reunification the unfinished hulls were bought by the Polish Navy and completed by Northern Shipyard in Gdańsk. Orkan is currently serving.
