= ORP Grom (1990) =

Polish warship

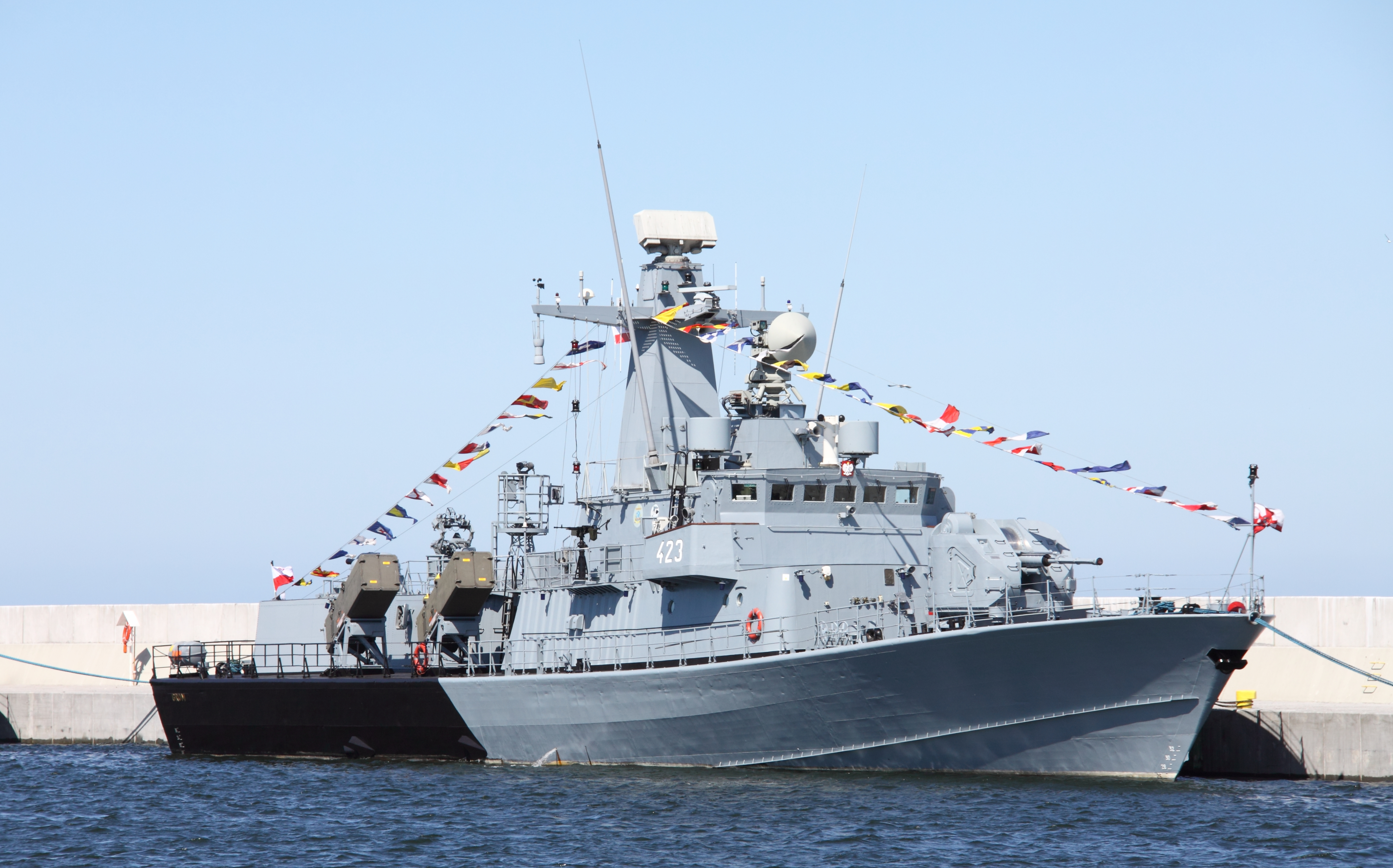
- ORP Grom

History

Poland
- Name: ORP Grom
- Namesake: ORP Grom, from the Polish word for thunderclap
- Laid down: 1989
- Launched: 11 December 1990
- Completed: 1994
- Commissioned: 1995
- Identification: MMSI number: 261299000; Callsign: SNWJ
- Status: In service

General characteristics
- Displacement: 369 tonnes
- Length: 48.9 m (160 ft 5 in)
- Beam: 8.65 m (28 ft 5 in)
- Draft: 2.15 m (7 ft 1 in)
- Propulsion: 3 x M520 diesel engines 3 shafts, 3,970 kilowatts (5,320 hp)
- Speed: 36 knots (67 km/h; 41 mph)
- Range: 1,620 nautical miles (3,000 km; 1,860 mi)
- Complement: 33
- Armament: 8 RBS-15 anti-ship missiles (Often, only 4 are carried); 1 AK–176 M 76.2 mm (3.00 in) gun; 1 AK-630 M 30 mm (1.2 in) AA gun; 1 Polish made Strzała-2M AA missiles launcher

ORP Grom is an Orkan-class fast attack craft. It is the sister ship of Orkan and Piorun.

The ship was the result of a construction project undertaken by the German Democratic Republic for its navy, named Project 660 ("Sassnitz class" in NATO code). After the unification of Germany the unfinished hulls were bought by the Polish Navy from VEB Peenewerft shipyard in Wolgast and completed in Northern Shipyard in Gdańsk.

After its completion in 1995 the ship was incorporated into the 31st Rocket Warships Squadron, 3rd Ship Flotilla.
