= ORP Piorun (1990) =

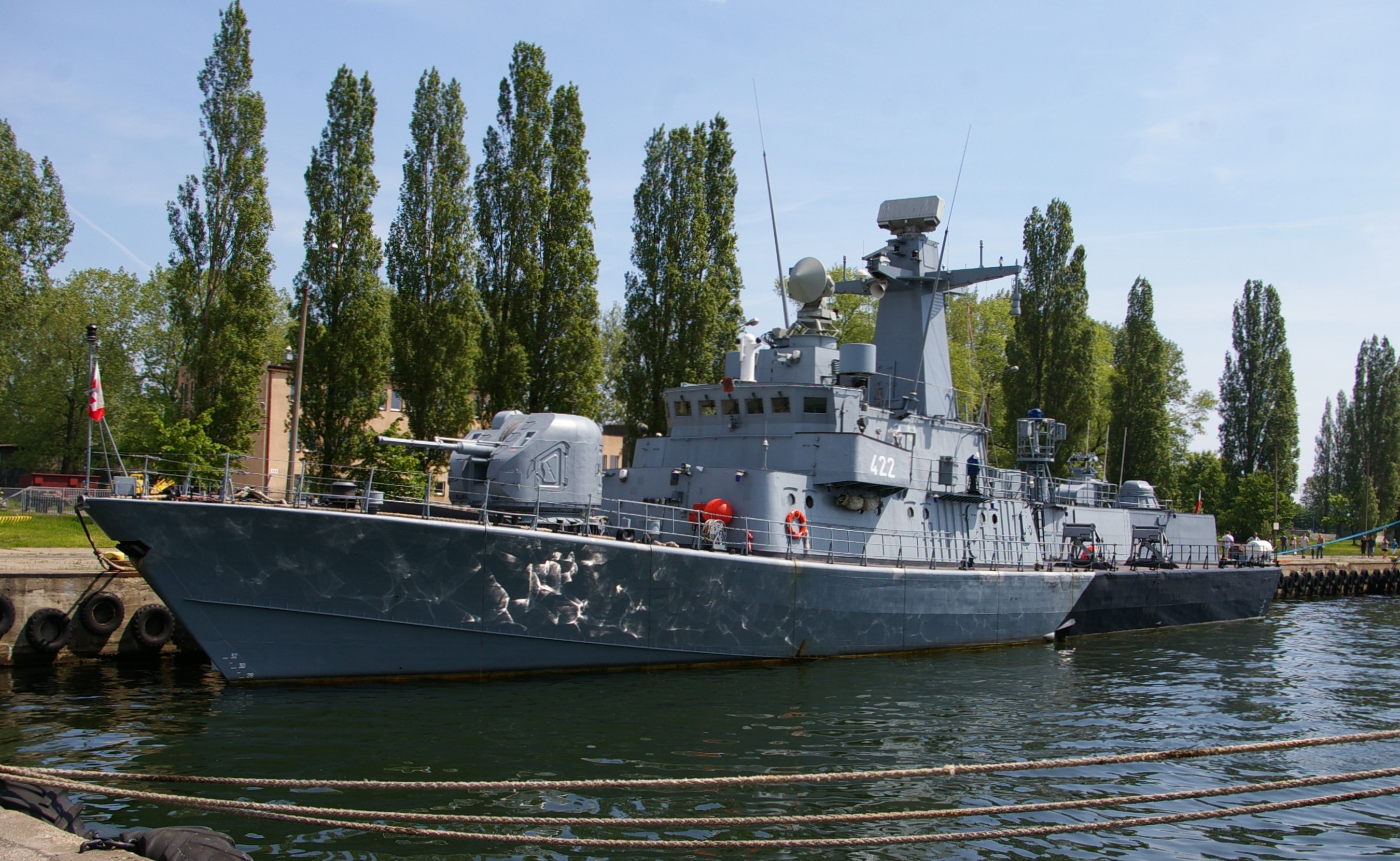
- ORP Piorun

History

Poland
- Name: ORP Piorun
- Namesake: ORP Piorun (G65), named in turn for lightning
- Laid down: 1989
- Launched: 19 October 1990
- Completed: 1994
- Commissioned: 1994
- Identification: MMSI number: 261298000; Callsign: SNWI
- Status: In service

General characteristics
- Class & type: Orkan-class fast attack craft
- Displacement: 369 t (363 long tons)
- Length: 48.9 m (160 ft 5 in)
- Beam: 8.65 m (28 ft 5 in)
- Draft: 2.15 m (7 ft 1 in)
- Propulsion: 3 x M520 diesel engines 3 shafts, 3,970 kilowatts (5,320 hp)
- Speed: 36 knots (67 km/h; 41 mph)
- Range: 1,620 nmi (3,000 km; 1,860 mi)
- Complement: 33
- Armament: 8 × canister-mounted RBS-15 Mk 3 anti-ship missiles; 1 × AK-176M 76.2 mm (3.00 in) naval gun; 1 × AK-630M 30 mm (1.2 in) CIWS; 1 × Strzała-2M anti-air missile launcher; 2 × WKM-B 12.7 mm (0.50 in) machine guns

ORP Piorun is an Orkan-class fast attack craft and sister ship of Grom and Orkan.

The original project was prepared by the German Democratic Republic for its navy and was named Project 660 ("Sassnitz class" in NATO code). After the Unification of Germany the unfinished hulls were bought by the Polish Navy from VEB Peenewerft shipyard in Wolgast and successfully completed in Northern Shipyard in Gdańsk.

After its completion in 1994 the ship was incorporated into the 31st Rocket Warships Squadron, 3rd Ship Flotilla.
