= ORP Orkan (1990) =

Polish missile boat of the Orkan class

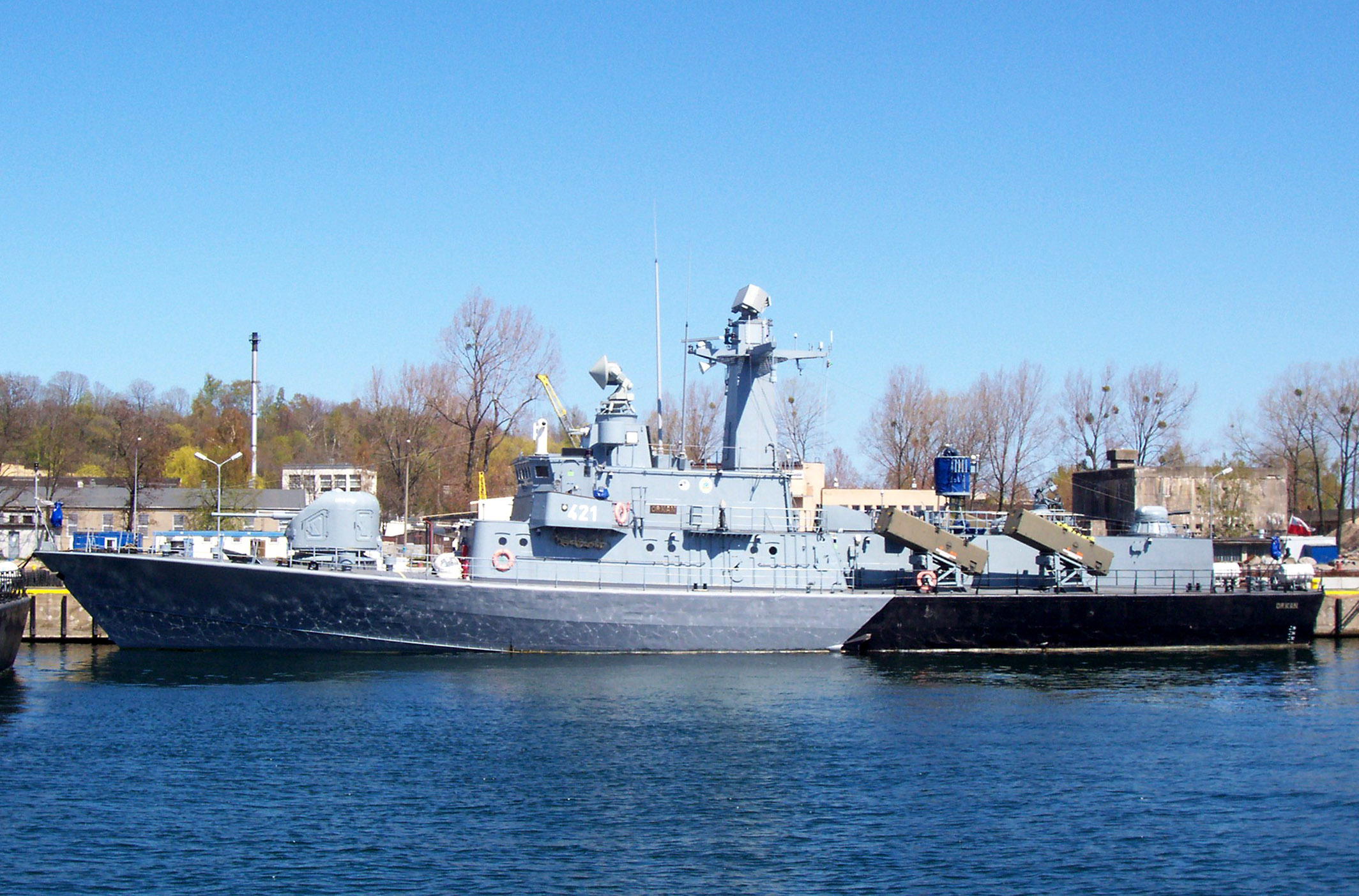

History

Poland
- Name: ORP Orkan
- Namesake: ORP Orkan (G90), named in turn for European windstorm
- Laid down: 1989
- Launched: 29 September 1990
- Completed: 1992
- Commissioned: 1992
- Identification: MMSI number: 261242000; Callsign: SNWH
- Status: In service

General characteristics
- Class & type: Orkan-class fast attack craft
- Displacement: 369 tonnes (363 long tons; 407 short tons)
- Length: 48.9 m (160 ft 5 in)
- Beam: 8.65 m (28 ft 5 in)
- Draft: 2.15 m (7 ft 1 in)
- Propulsion: 3 × M520 diesel engines 3 shafts, 3,970 kW (5,320 hp)
- Speed: 36 knots (67 km/h; 41 mph)
- Range: 1,620 nmi (3,000 km; 1,860 mi)
- Complement: 33
- Armament: 4 × RBS-15 anti-ship missiles; 1 × AK–176 M 76.2 mm (3.00 in) gun; 1 × AK-630 M 30 mm (1.2 in) AA gun; 1 × Strzała-2M AA missiles launcher

ORP Orkan is an Orkan-class fast attack craft and sister ship of Grom and Piorun.

The original project was prepared by the German Democratic Republic for its navy and was named Project 660 (Sassnitz class in NATO code). After the Unification of Germany the unfinished hulls were bought by the Polish Navy from VEB Peenewerft shipyard in Wolgast and successfully completed in Northern Shipyard in Gdańsk.

After its completion in 1992 the ship was incorporated into the 31st Rocket Warships Squadron, 3rd Ship Flotilla.
