= Orkan-class fast attack craft =

Polish naval ship class

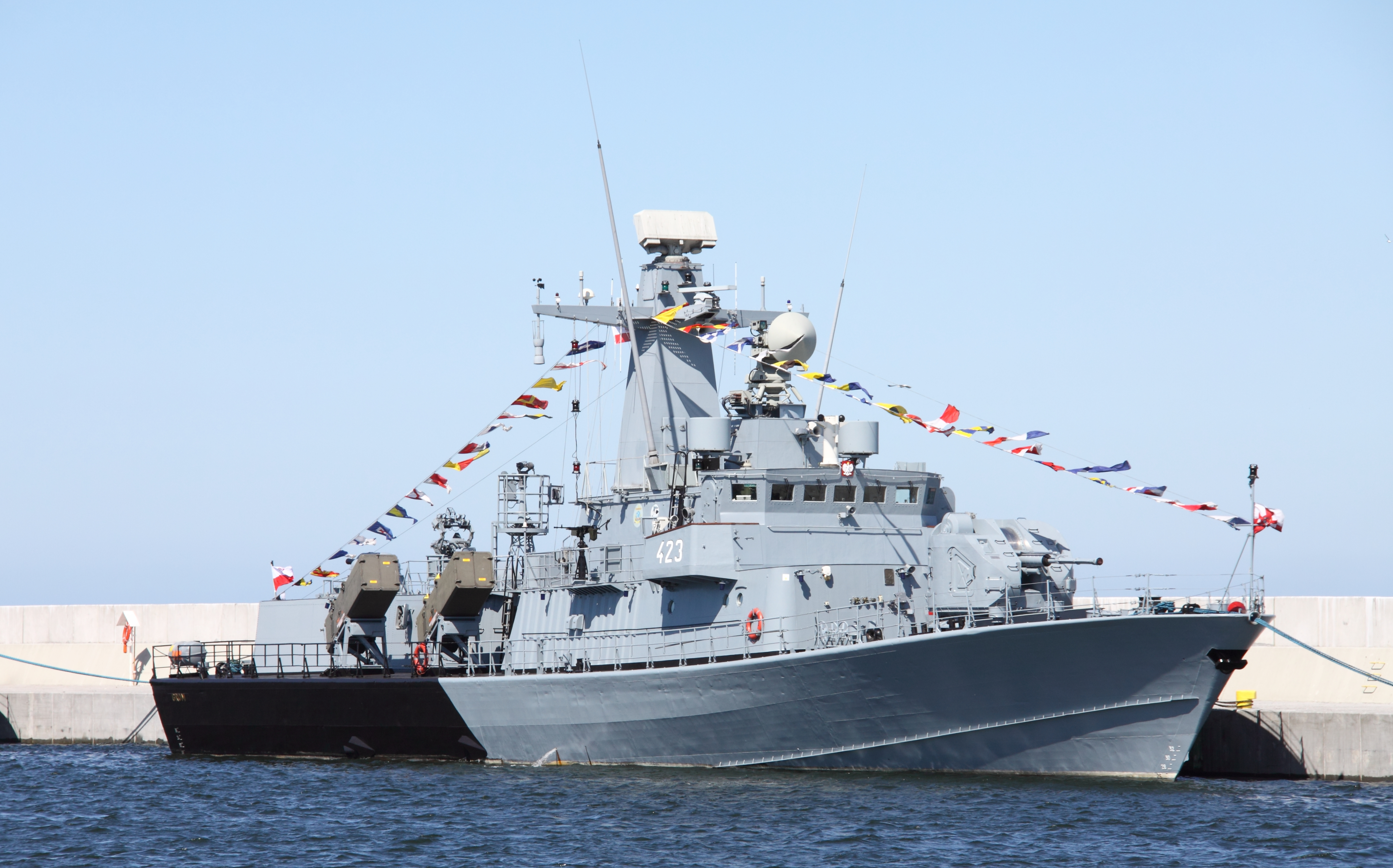
- ORP Grom

Class overview
- Builders: VEB Peene-Werft, Wolgast; Northern Shipyard, Gdańsk
- Operators: Polish Navy
- In service: 1992–present
- Active: 3

General characteristics
- Type: Fast attack craft
- Displacement: 369 tonnes
- Length: 48.90 m (160 ft 5 in)
- Beam: 8.65 m (28 ft 5 in)
- Draft: 2.15 m (7 ft 1 in)
- Propulsion: 3 diesel M520 engines 3,970 kW (5,320 hp) each
- Speed: 36 knots (67 km/h; 41 mph)
- Range: 3,000 km (1,600 nmi)
- Complement: 33
- Sensors & processing systems: Sea Giraffe 3-D radar, STING EO fire control radar
- Armament: 8 × RBS-15 Mk. III anti-ship missiles (ships often carry just 4 missiles); 1 × 76 mm (3 in) AK-176M gun; 1 × AK-630 30 mm (1.2 in) gun Close-in weapon system; 1 × 4-rail Strela 2M launcher; 2 x WKM-Bm 12.7 mm heavy machine gun posts

The Orkan class or projekt 660M (NATO code: Sassnitz class) is series of three fast attack craft of the Polish Navy, in service since 1992.

== History ==
The original project was prepared by the German Democratic Republic for its navy and was named Project 151; it received the NATO reporting name "Sassnitz". After the Unification of Germany the three unfinished hulls were bought by the Polish Navy from VEB Peenewerft shipyard in Wolgast and successfully completed by Northern Shipyard in Gdańsk. Two more unfinished fuselage were scrapped in Germany. In total up to nine units were planned by the GDR. Poland developed a similar attack craft design in the 1970s, but the construction was cancelled in 1980 following Soviet Union denial to export the necessary weapon systems, forcing Poland to order Tarantul missile corvettes in the 1980s.

In 2006, the Ministry of Defence ordered 36 RBS-15 Mk 3 anti-ship missiles to equip the ships. Since 2007, they carried RBS-15 Mk 2 missiles as interim armament. RBS-15 Mk 3 missiles were first deployed in 2014. Since 2015 Orkan and Piorun underwent a 19-month, mid-life refit.

== List of ships ==
Pennant number	Name	Commissioned
421	Orkan	18 September 1992
422	Piorun	11 March 1994
423	Grom	28 April 1995

The lead ship of the class is named Orkan (Polish: Hurricane), while other two ships are Piorun (Polish: Thunderbolt) and Grom (Polish: Thunderclap). Piorun and Grom were famous Polish destroyers of the Second World War. Orkan was to have been the first destroyer constructed in Poland, but her construction was interrupted by the start of the World War II.

== Gallery ==
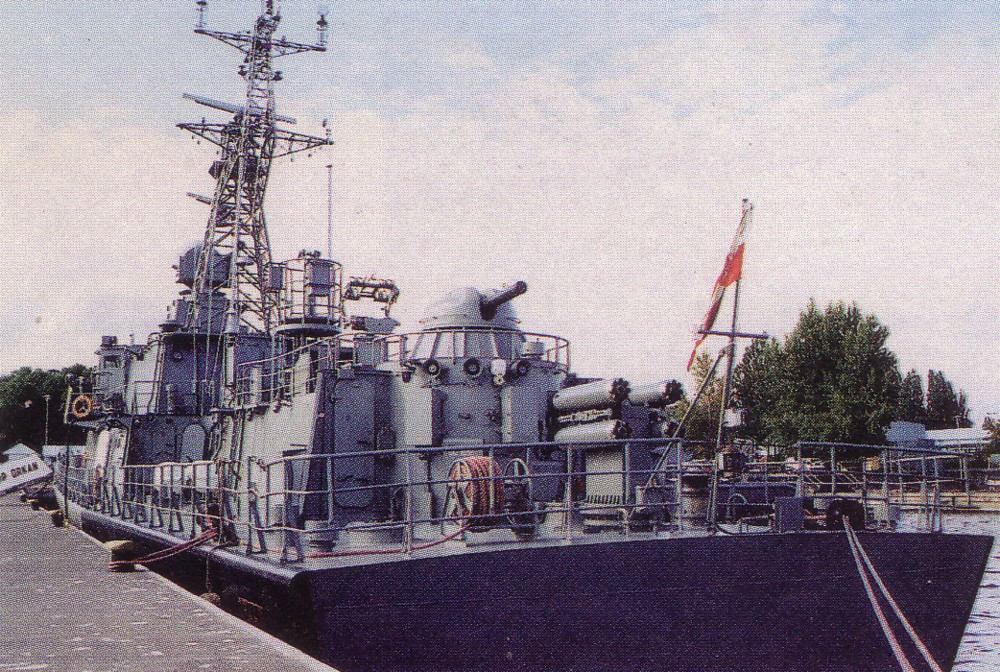
Orkan before modernisation

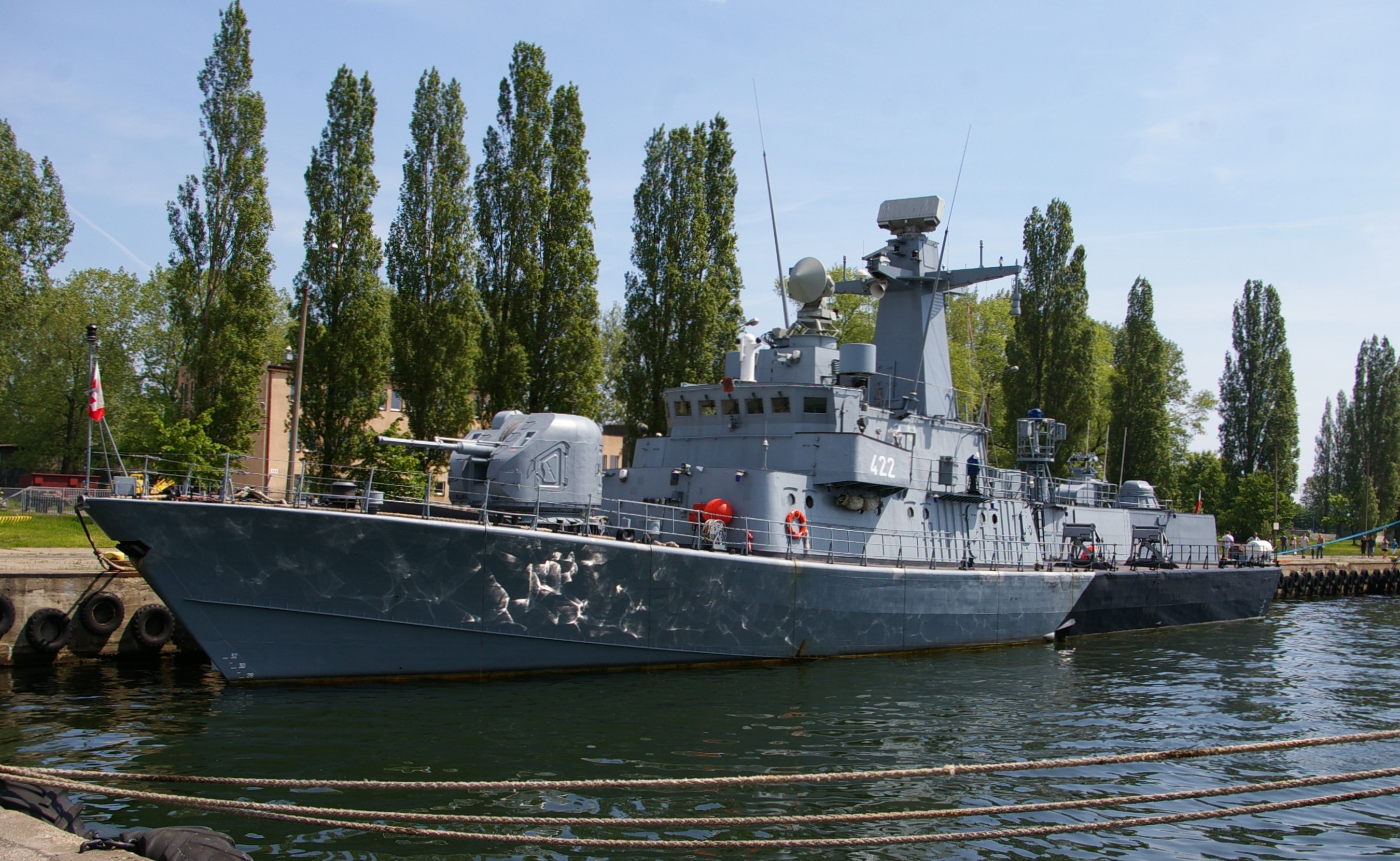
Piorun

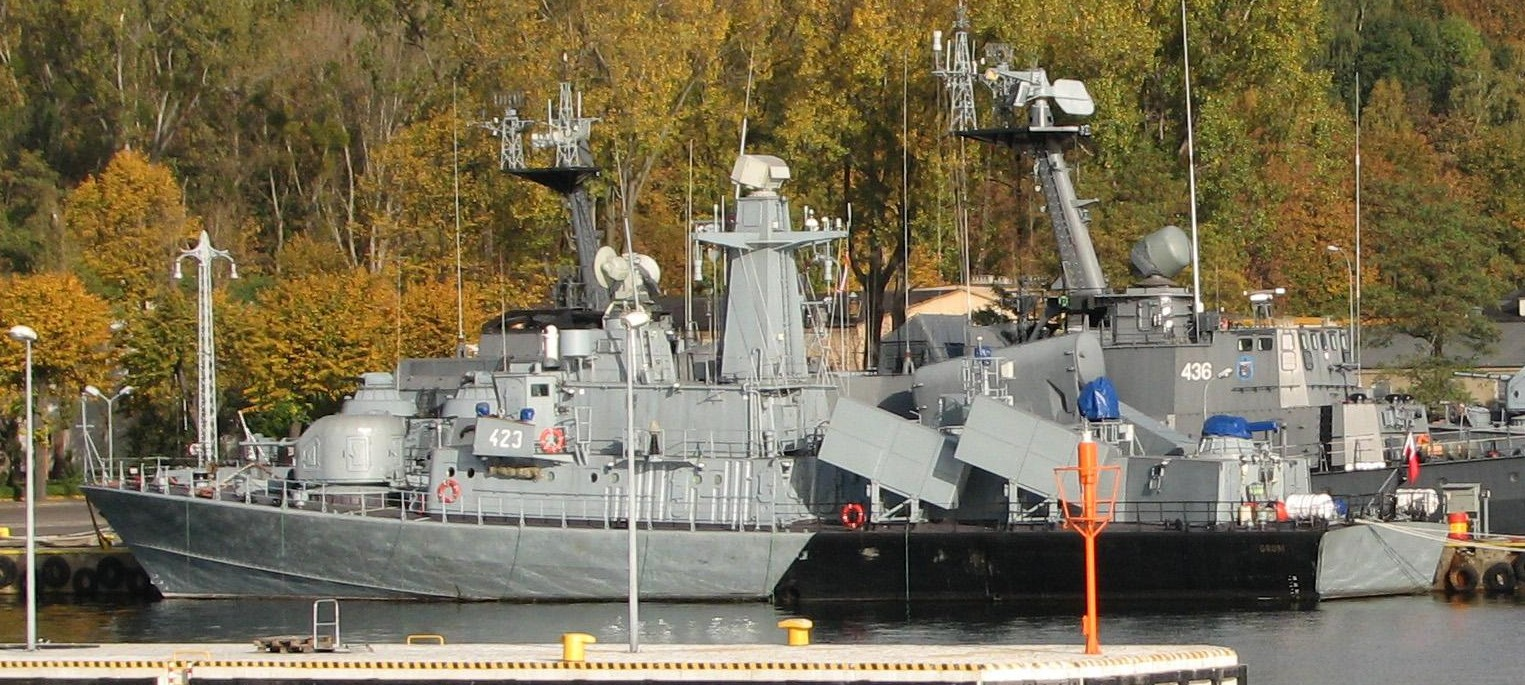
Grom in 2008 armed with 8 RBS-15 Mk2

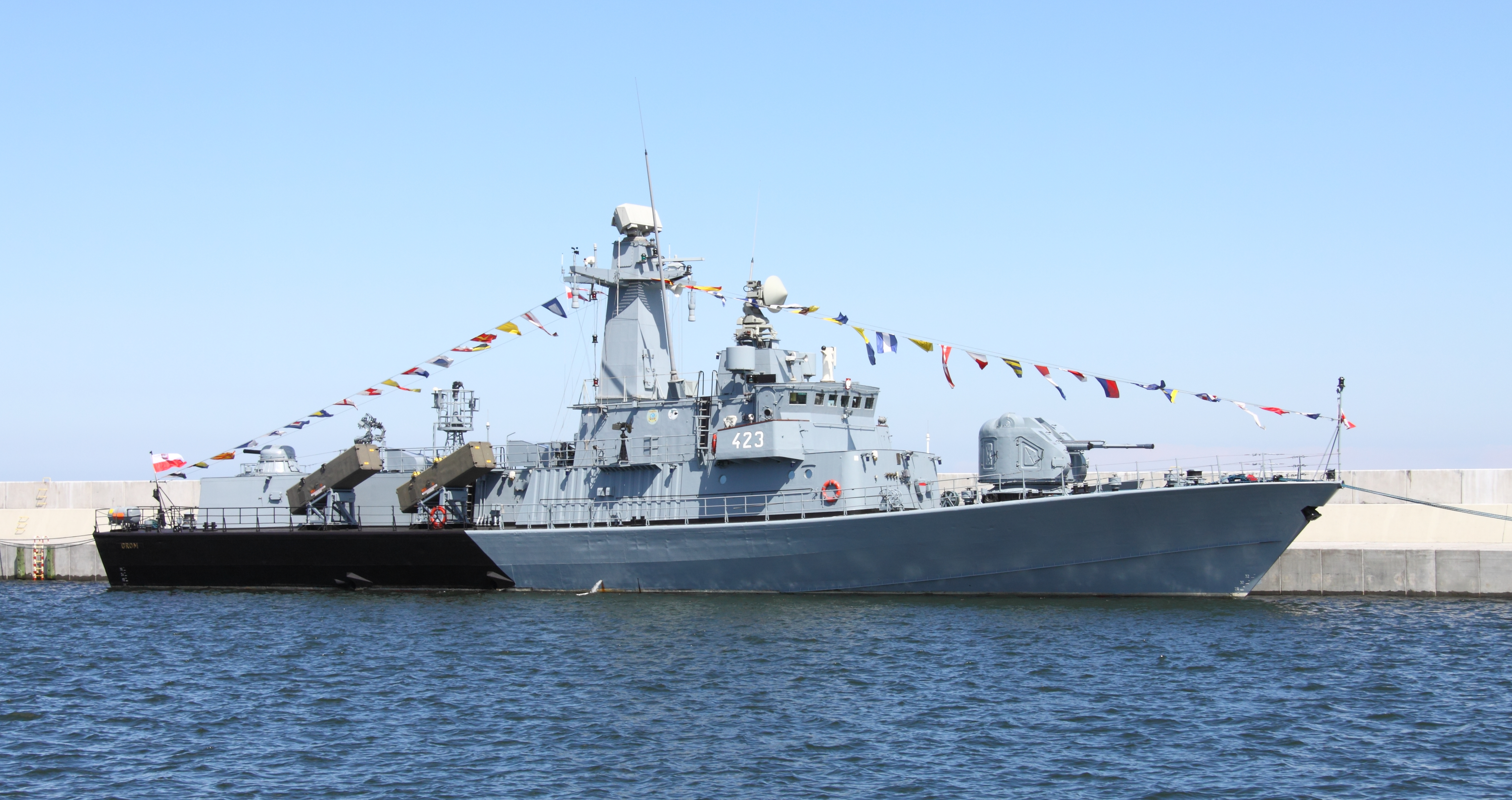
Grom in 2011, armed with 4 RBS-15 Mk2
