= 3rd Ship Flotilla =

3rd Ship Flotilla of Polish Navy
- 3 Flotylla Okrętów
- Shoulder sleeve insignia
- Active: 1971 - present
- Country: Poland
- Branch: Polish Navy
- Size: 3000 personnel 22 vessels
- Base: Gdynia-Oksywie Naval Base
- Patron: Komandor Bolesław Romanowski
- Equipment: Warships, Submarines, Auxiliary

Insignia
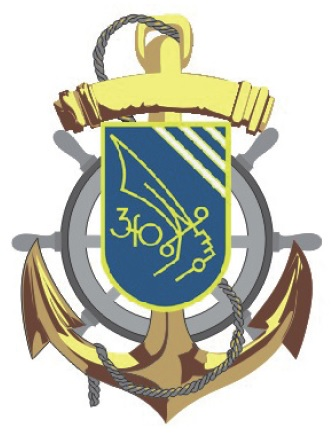
- 3 FO Command distinctive unit insignia

3rd Ship Flotilla (Polish: 3 Flotylla Okrętów (3 FO)) is a tactical unit of the Polish Navy composed of 11 subunits. The unit is a main strike force of the Polish Navy, it operates various warships types such as frigates, corvettes, submarines or fast attack crafts. The main base of 3 FO is Gdynia-Oksywie Naval Base.

== Sub-Units ==
- Submarine Unit (Dywizjon Okrętów Podwodnych)
- Combat Ship Squadron (Dywizjon Okrętów Bojowych)
- Support Unit (Dywizjon Okrętów Wsparcia)
- Reconnaissance Group (Grupa Okrętów Rozpoznawczych, gOR)
- 9th Anti-Air Wing (9 Dywizjon Przeciwlotniczy)
- 43rd Sapper Battalion (43 Battalion Saperów)
- Naval Base Command (Komenda Portu Wojennego Gdynia)
- Technical Base of Polish Navy (Baza Techniczna Marynarki Wojennej)
- Hel Peninsula Naval Base (Punkt Bazowania Hel)

== Equipment ==
=== Vessels ===
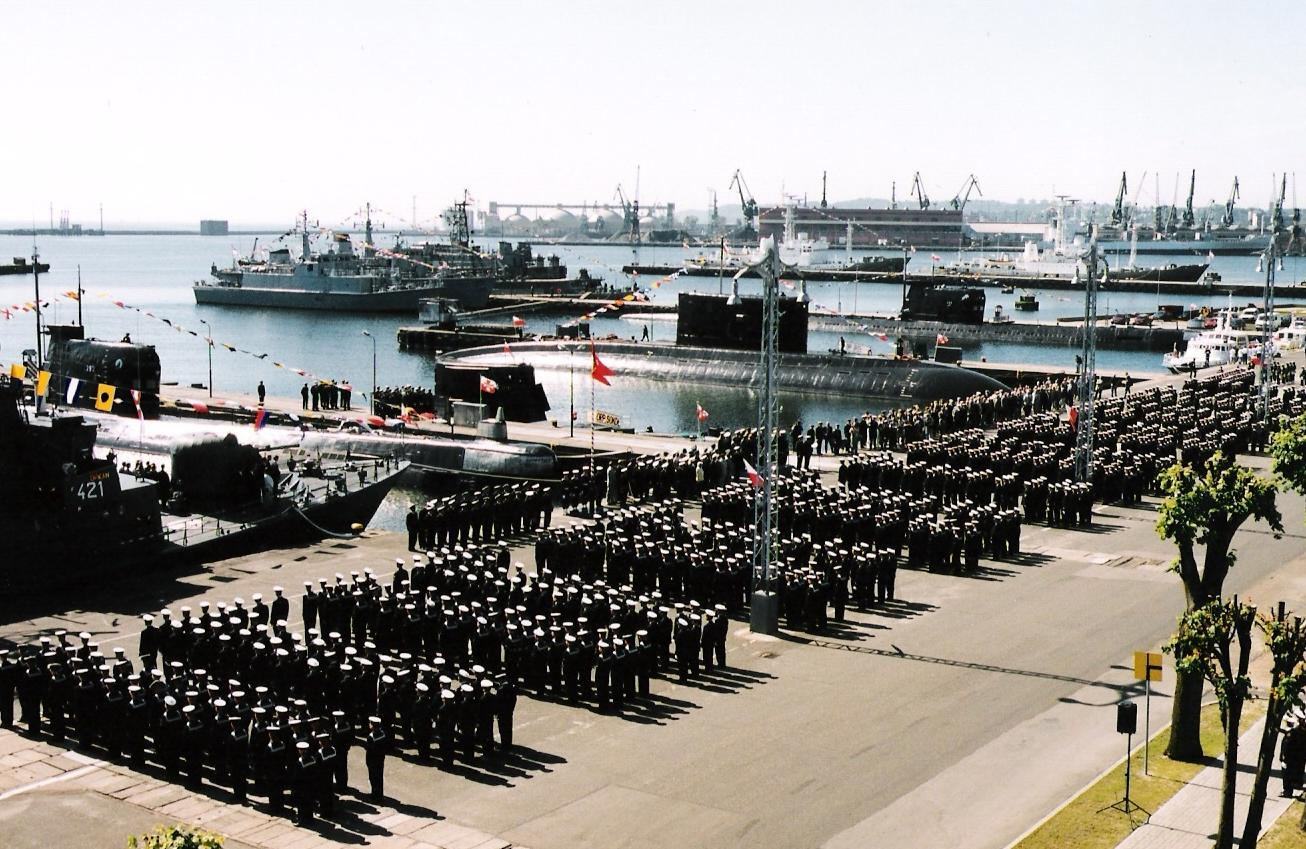
Gdynia-Oksywie Naval Base

Vessel	Origin	Type	In service	Unit	Notes
Oliver Hazard Perry class	United States	Frigate	2	Anti-Submarine Unit	
Kilo class	Soviet Union	Submarine	1	Submarine Unit	
Orkan class	East Germany	Fast Attack Craft	3	Missile Vessels Unit	
Project 888	Poland	Training Ship	1	Support Unit	
Project 570M	Poland	Rescue Ship	2	Support Unit	
Project 5002	Poland	Rescue Ship	2	Support Unit	
Project 863	Poland	Reconnaissance Vessel	2	Reconnaissance Group	
