= Type 0112 gunboat =

Experimental hydrofoil in China

Class overview
- Operators: People's Liberation Army Navy

General characteristics
- Type: Gunboat
- Installed power: Internal combustion engine
- Propulsion: Diesel engine
- Sensors & processing systems: 1 × navigational radar
- Armament: guns

The Type 0112 gunboat was an experimental hydrofoil developed by China for the People's Liberation Army Navy (PLAN) in the mid-1960s. Only a single unit was built and it has since retired from PLAN.

The Type 0112 gunboat was built in Shanghai by the PLAN No. 4805 Factory, the predecessor of the current Shenjia Shipyard (申佳船厂). It was launched on June 6, 1966, with hull number 594, and the boat was launched on September 17 the same year. Sea trials lasted from September 21 to October 31, 1966, and on December 21, 1966, the design was finalized. Because it was an experimental craft, it remained with PLAN 21st Corvette Flotilla, the flotilla assigned to test out new boats, and it was not until May 1968 that the boat was finally handed over to a combat unit, the 16th Fast Attack Craft Squadron. Various problems arose after the boat was delivered because of the political turmoil in China at the time, namely, the Cultural Revolution, and, coupled with poor seakeeping, Type 0112 failed to enter series production. The single unit built was retired.
