= Sharp (surname) =

Sharp is an English language surname, cognate to the German scharf. It is also akin to words which have the sense of scraping, e.g. Latin scrobis 'ditch', Russian skresti 'to scrape'.

Recorded variations of the surname include Sharpe, Shairp, Sharpes, Sharps and the diminutives Sharpin, Sharplin and Sharpling. It originates from a medieval nickname, with the derivation from the Old English word "scearp", meaning sharp and used to describe a "sharp or smart" person.

== People bearing the surname Sharp ==
=== A ===
- Abraham Sharp (1651–1742), English schoolmaster, mathematician and astronomer
- Alan Sharp (1934–2013), Scottish author
- Alex Sharp (disambiguation), several people
- Anne Sharp (1916–2011), Scottish soprano
- Anthony Sharp (Quaker) (1643–1707), Dublin Quaker
- Anthony Sharp (1915–1984), English actor
- Archie Sharp (born 1995), British boxer
- Arthur Sharp (1905–1991), English footballer

=== B ===
- Bartholomew Sharp (c. 1650–1702), English buccaneer
- Bauer Sharp (born 2003), American football player
- Billy Sharp (born 1986), English professional footballer
- Bree Sharp (born 1975), American singer and songwriter

=== C ===
- Cecil Sharp (1859–1924), English music teacher and traditional English dance expert
- Chris Sharp (born 1973), American singer
- Christopher Sharp (cricketer) (born 1964), former English cricketer
- Christopher Sharp (barrister) (born 1953), British barrister and Deputy High Court Judge
- Clifford Sharp, British journalist

=== D ===
- Dallas Lore Sharp (1870–1929), American nature author and university professor
- Dave Sharp (born 1959), English guitarist
- David Sharp (entomologist) (1840–1922), English physician and entomologist
- David Sharp (mountaineer) (1972–2006), Everest mountain climber
- Dee Dee Sharp (born 1945), American rhythm and blues singer
- Dennis Sharp (1933–2010), British architect
- Derrick Sharp (born 1971), American-Israeli professional basketball player
- Don Sharp (1922–2011), British film director
- Dorothea Sharp (1874–1955), British artist
- Dudley C. Sharp (1905–1987), former Secretary of the United States Air Force

=== E ===
- Elliott Sharp (born 1951), American avant-garde musician
- Emanuel Sharp (born 2004), Israeli-American basketball player
- Emily Sharp (born 1983), birth name of professional wrestler Daizee Haze
- Emma Sharp (1832–1920), English race walker

=== F ===
- Frank Sharp (disambiguation)

=== G ===
- Gene Sharp (1928–2018), political scientist
- George Sharp (footballer)
- Graeme Sharp (born 1960), Scottish footballer
- Granville Sharp (1735–1813), English abolitionist

=== H ===
- Hap Sharp (1928–1993), American Formula One driver
- Harry Sharp (disambiguation)

=== I ===
- Isaac Sharp (1681–1735), early New Jersey settler, judge, politician, and colonel
- Isadore Sharp (born 1931), Canadian businessman

=== J ===
- Jack Sharp (1878–1938), English international footballer and test cricketer
- Jamarion Sharp (born 2001), American basketball player
- James E. Sharp (born 1940), American lawyer
- James Sharp (bishop) (1613–1679), Scottish clergyman
- James Sharp (footballer, born 1870), Scottish footballer
- James Sharp (footballer, born 1894), Scottish footballer
- James Sharp (footballer, born 1976), English footballer
- John Sharp (actor) (1920–1992), British television actor
- John Sharp (Archbishop of York) (1643–1714), Archbishop of York
- John Sharp (Australian politician) (born 1954), Australian politician
- John Sharp (Texas politician) (born 1950), a former Texas politician
- Jon Sharp (born 1967), English former head coach of Huddersfield Giants
- Jonathan Sharp (1964–2009), English record producer
- Joseph Sharp (c. 1709–1776), early settler of New Jersey
- Joseph Henry Sharp (1859–1953), artist (Taos Art Colony)
- Julia Sharp, American statistician
- J. W. Sharp (c. 1818–1856), English comic entertainer

=== K ===
- K. B. Sharp (born 1981), professional women's basketball player
- Katharine Dooris Sharp (1846–1935), American botanist and poet
- Kevin Sharp (1970–2014), American country music artist
- Kevin Sharp (footballer) (born 1974), Canadian-born footballer
- Kevin Sharp (heavy metal), American heavy metal singer for Venomous Concept and Brutal Truth

=== L ===
- Leonard Sharp (1890–1958), British actor
- Lesley Sharp (born 1964), English actress
- Lester W. Sharp (1887–1961), American botanist
- Liam Sharp (born 1968), British comic book artist
- Linda K. Sharp, women's basketball coach
- Lindsay Sharp, museum director
- Louis Sharp (born 2007), New Zealand racing driver

=== M ===
- Maia Sharp, country music singer and songwriter
- Margaret Sharp, Baroness Sharp of Guildford (born 1938), member of the British House of Lords
- Margery Sharp (1905–1991), English writer
- Marie Sharp (born 1940), Belizean businesswoman
- Martha Sharp (1905–1999), American philanthropist
- Martin Sharp (1942–2013), Australian cartoonist, songwriter and film-maker
- Martin Sharp (historian) (1847–1910), English historian
- Matt Sharp (born 1969), American rock bassist
- Minnie Bell Sharp (1865–1937), pianist and singer
- Mitchell Sharp (1911–2004), Canadian politician

=== N ===
- Norm Sharp (1934–2014), AFL 1952 premiership player
- Norma Sharp (born 1943), American operatic soprano

=== P ===
- Pat Sharp (born 1961), British television presenter
- Patrick Sharp (born 1981), Canadian ice hockey centre
- Peter Sharp (disambiguation), multiple people
- Philip Sharp (disambiguation), multiple people
- Phillip Allen Sharp (born 1944), American geneticist and molecular biologist

=== R ===
- Randy Sharp, songwriter
- Ray Sharp (born 1969), Scottish footballer
- Ray Sharp (badminton) (born 1945), English badminton player and medallist in 1970 British Commonwealth Games
- Rhod Sharp (born 1953), Scottish-born broadcaster
- Richard Sharp (politician) known as Conversation Sharp, English wit
- Richard Sharp (rugby union) (1938–2025), English rugby player
- Rodney Sharp a director of the DuPont corporation
- Ronald Sharp (1929–2021), Australian organ builder
- Ryan Sharp (born 1979), British race car driver

=== S ===
- Sage Sharp (born 1985), American software engineer
- Samuel Sharp (disambiguation)
- Scott Sharp (born 1968), an American race car driver
- Solomon P. Sharp (1787–1825), American politician
- Steve Sharp (disambiguation)
- Susie Sharp (1907–1996), American jurist
- Sylver Logan Sharp, vocalist

=== T ===
- Terri Sharp (1948–2015), American singer
- Thomas Sharp (priest) (1693–1758), English churchman (Archdeacon of Northumberland), biographer and theological writer
- Thomas C. Sharp (1818–1894), opponent of Joseph Smith Jr. and the Latter Day Saints
- Thomas Wilfred Sharp (1901–1978), English town planner and author
- Tia Sharp (2000–2012), English murder victim
- Timm Sharp (born 1978), American actor
- Tom Sharp (cricketer), English first-class cricketer for Cornwall CCC and Unicorns

=== V ===
- Verity Sharp (born 1970), BBC Radio Three presenter

=== W ===
- Waitstill Sharp (1902–1984), American Unitarian minister and humanitarian
- Walter Benona Sharp (1870–1912), American oil drilling pioneer, innovator and philanthropist
- Wanda Sharp (born 1950), American politician
- Wilf Sharp (1907–1981), English footballer with Airdrieonians and Sheffield Wednesday
- William Sharp (engraver) (1749–1824), English engraver
- William Sharp (writer) (1855–1905), Scottish author and poet, pseudonym Fiona MacLeod
- William Graves Sharp (1859–1922), American lawyer, Congressman and diplomat
- Willie Sharp (1922–1992), Scottish footballer
- Willoughby Sharp (1936–2008), artist

=== Z ===
- Zerna Sharp (1889–1981), American teacher

== Fictional characters ==
- Becky Sharp, protagonist of Vanity Fair (novel), William Makepeace Thackeray's novel
- Deryn Sharp, in Leviathan, a Scott Westerfeld novel
- Gavin Sharp, in the soap opera EastEnders
- John Sharp, the player character in the 2011 video game Cabela's Big Game Hunter 2012
- Phineas Sharp, a villain in the Disney animated series Darkwing Duck
- Aesop Sharp, a professor in the Harry Potter series in the 2023 video game called Hogwarts Legacy
- Silka Sharp, a tribute in the 2025 dystopian novel Sunrise on the Reaping

== See also ==
- General Sharp (disambiguation)
- Justice Sharp (disambiguation)
- Senator Sharp (disambiguation)
- Sharp (disambiguation)
- Sharpe (surname)
- Shairp
- Scharf, Scharff
