= Scharf =

The surnames Scharf, Schärf, Schaerff, Sharf, as well as similar spellings of these names, usually have their origins in either the German or Irish languages. As a result of emigration from Europe, these surnames are now also common throughout the United States, Canada and Australia.

The German variants, which were likely spelled Schärf or Schaerf originally, usually trace their origins to Bavaria, although the surname is now common over all of Germany. Literally meaning "sharp", it is regarded as having originated as a medieval nickname, i.e. it described an attribute of an individual's personality, such as sharp-wittedness. The Yiddish spelling Sharf, as well as the other variants, are found among Ashkenazi Jews.

In Ireland, Scharf and related surnames, such as Scariff, were originally found in the south-western counties of Kerry and Limerick. They are now also common in counties Kilkenny and Carlow. In Ireland, there are several different folk etymologies of the surname. One claims that it is indigenous to Ireland, although no Old Irish personal names closely resembling it have been identified. A second theory of the surname's origins holds that it came to Ireland with the Norse-speaking Vikings that invaded and settled in Ireland, becoming known as the Norse Gaels. Following the Viking invasions of Ireland in the 10th century, many Vikings and their descendants were gaelicized. According to this theory, one or more Vikings carried the name "Skarf", literally "cormorant", but also in a vernacular sense "glutton", "scoundrel" or "rascal". After Oliver Cromwell invaded and reconquered Ireland, prejudicial laws were enacted by the British. The Statutes of Kilkenny banned the use of the Irish language (including personal names) in most of Leinster. Many indigenous Irish anglicized their names to sound even more English. Hence, through complex and varying degrees of gaelicization and anglicization, a name such as Skarf may have become various names in different parts of Ireland, including Scarf, Scarffe, Scarriff and Scharf.

== Notable bearers ==
Notable people with the name include:

- Aaron Scharf (1922–1993), American born British art historian
- Adolf Schärf (1890–1965), Austrian politician of the Social Democratic Party
- Caleb Scharf, American astronomer
- Charles W. Scharf, American businessman, CEO, and board member
- Dorothy Scharf (1942–2004), English philanthropist and art collector
- Eddy Scharf (born 1953), German poker player
- Eduard Scharf (musician) (1857–1927), German pianist in Australia
- Erwin Schärf (1914–1994), Austrian politician
- George Johann Scharf (1788–1860), German-born English painter, draughtsman and lithographer
- George Scharf (1820–1895), British art critic, illustrator, and director of the National Portrait Gallery
- Gerhard Scharf, Austrian para table tennis player
- Henry Scharf (1822–1887), English-born American illustrator, Shakespearean actor, and professor
- John Thomas Scharf (1843–1898), American historian, author, journalist, and politician
- Julia Scharf (born 1981), German journalist
- Jürgen Scharf (born 1952), German politician
- Kenny Scharf (born 1958), American painter
- Kurt Scharf (1902–1990), German clergyman and bishop of the Evangelical Church in Germany
- Ludwig Scharf (1864–1939), German lyricist and translator
- Mark Scharf (born 1956), American playwright, actor and teacher
- Mark Scharf (born 1963), American Photographer, Artist, Graphic Artist, magazine publisher
- Michael Scharf (born 1963), American law professor, Director of the Summer Institute for Global Justice
- Michael Scharf (poet) (born 1969), American poet and critic
- Natasha Scharf, British author, disc jockey, presenter and journalist
- Nick Scharf (1858–1937), American baseball player
- Roman Scharf, Austrian businessman
- Shlomo Scharf (born 1943), Israeli football player and manager
- Stuart Scharf (c. 1941–2007), American composer, guitarist, and philosopher
- Ted Scharf (born 1951), Canadian ice hockey player
- Ulrike Scharf (born 1967), German politician (CSU)
- Walter Scharf (1910–2003), American film composer
- Werner Scharf (1905–1945), German actor
- Wilfried Scharf (born 1955), Austrian zither player and professor
- William Scharf (1927–2018), American artist

== See also ==
- Scharff (includes Scharffs)
- Sharp
- Sharpe
