= Sharpe (surname) =

Sharpe is a surname. Notable people with the name include:

== Government ==
- Alfred Sharpe (1853–1935), British colonial administrator
- Edward M. Sharpe (1887–1975), Associate Justice of the Michigan Supreme Court
- George Sharpe (politician) (c. 1907 – 1985), Canadian politician, mayor of Winnipeg
- George H. Sharpe (1828–1900), American lawyer, soldier, secret service officer, diplomat and politician
- Henry A. Sharpe (1848–1919), Associate Justice of the Alabama Supreme Court
- Horatio Sharpe (1718–1790), British Royal Governor of Maryland
- James Sharpe (Australian politician)
- Larry Sharpe (politician) (born 1968), American business consultant and political activist
- Merrell Q. Sharpe, American politician
- Montagu Sharpe (1857–1942), English lawyer and antiquarian
- Nelson Sharpe (1858–1935), Associate Justice of the Michigan Supreme Court
- Penny Sharpe, Australian politician
- Peter Sharpe (1777–1842), American politician, Representative from New York
- Robert Sharpe (judge) (born 1945), Justice of the Court of Appeal for Ontario
- Roger Sharpe, American author and politician, former member of the North Carolina Senate
- Thomas Sharpe (politician) (1866–1919), Canadian politician, mayor of Winnipeg
- William Sharpe (North Carolina politician) (1742–1818), U.S. lawyer and politician
- William R. Sharpe Jr. (1928–2009), American member of the West Virginia Senate

== Sports ==
- Albert Sharpe (American football) (1877–1966), American athlete and coach
- Bud Sharpe, American baseball player
- David Sharpe (born 1967), British runner
- David Sharpe (American football) (born 1995), American football player
- Dougie Sharpe (1926–1974), Scottish footballer
- Duncan Sharpe (born 1937), Pakistani cricketer
- Gerry Sharpe (1946–2019), English footballer
- Harry Sharpe (cricketer) (1901–1950), English cricketer
- Harry Sharpe (footballer), English footballer
- Jamari Sharpe (born 2003), American football player
- Jimmy Sharpe, American college football coach
- John Sharpe (cricketer), (1866–1936), English cricketer
- Lee Sharpe, (born 1971), English footballer
- Luis Sharpe (1960–2025), Cuban player of American football
- Mike Sharpe, American wrestler
- Nathan Sharpe, Australian rugby union player
- Phil Sharpe (cricketer) (1936–2014), English cricketer
- Phil Sharpe (footballer) (born 1968), English footballer
- Ricky Sharpe (American football), American football player
- Shaedon Sharpe (born 2003), Canadian basketball player
- Shannon Sharpe (born 1968), U.S. American football player
- Sterling Sharpe (born 1965), U.S. American football player
- Tony Sharpe (born 1961), Jamaican-born Canadian sprinter
- Wendy Sharpe (footballer) (born 1963), New Zealand football player

== Academics ==
- Alexander Sharpe (1814–1890), English philologist
- Daniel Sharpe (1806–1856), English geologist
- Emily Mary Bowdler Sharpe (born 1868), English entomologist and illustrator
- Eric J. Sharpe, Australian scholar of religious studies
- Kevin Sharpe (historian) (1949–2011)
- Richard Sharpe (historian) (1954–2020)
- Richard Bowdler Sharpe, (1847–1909), English zoologist
- Robert Sharpe (judge), Canadian lawyer, author, academic, and judge
- Samuel Sharpe (scholar) (1799–1881), Egyptologist and translator of the Bible
- William F. Sharpe, (born 1934), U.S. economist and inventor of the Sharpe ratio

== Arts ==
- Allan Sharpe (1949–2004), Scottish actor, theatre director and playwright
- Albert Sharpe, Irish stage and film actor
- Avery Sharpe, American jazz musician
- Bill Sharpe, British musician
- Cornelia Sharpe (born 1943), American former actress and model
- Craig Sharpe, contestant on Canadian Idol 4
- Don Sharpe (died in 2004), sound editor
- Gerry Sharpe (1929–1968), American photographer
- Lennox Sharpe (born 1963), Trinidad and Tobago steelband composer
- Matthew Sharpe (born 1962), U.S. novelist
- Tom Sharpe, (1928–2013), English satirical author of the novel Wilt
- Tyler-Justin Sharpe (born 2002), American rapper and singer known professionally as Lil Tecca
- Wendy Sharpe, (born 1960), Australian artist
- Will Sharpe, Japanese-English actor, writer, and director

== Others ==
- Charles Richard Sharpe, English recipient of the Victoria Cross
- Edmund Sharpe, (1809–1877), English architect and engineer
- Henry Granville Sharpe (1858–1947), Quartermaster General of the U.S. Army
- John Sharpe (Australian murderer)
- Karen Sharpe (born 1934), American former actress
- Mal Sharpe (1936–2020), U.S. radio and TV personality
- Samuel Sharpe, 19th-century Jamaican missionary and revolutionary
- Thomas Sharpe (RAF officer) (1887–?), British flying ace

== Fictional characters ==
- Chris Sharpe, a character in Degrassi: The Next Generation
- in the American soap opera The Bold and the Beautiful
  - Deacon Sharpe
  - Macy Alexander Sharpe
- Miriam Sharpe, in the Marvel Comics universe
- Richard Sharpe (fictional character), central character in the novel and television series Sharpe
- Steven Sharpe III, alias The Gambler, a member of the Golden Age Green Lantern's rogues' gallery.
- Thomas and Lucille Sharpe, principal characters in Crimson Peak

== See also ==
- Sharp (surname)
- Shairp
- Scharping
- Scharf, Scharff
