= Harry Sharpe =

Harry Sharpe may refer to:

- Harry Sharpe (cricketer) (1901–1950), English first-class cricketer and Royal Navy officer
- Harry Sharpe (footballer) (fl. 1910s), English footballer

== See also ==
- Harold Sharpe (1886–1960), Anglican Archdeacon in Africa
- Harry Sharp (disambiguation)
- Henry Sharpe (disambiguation)
