= James Sharp =

James Sharp may refer to:

- James Sharp (bishop) (1613–1679), Archbishop of St Andrews
- James Sharp (mayor) (1843–1904), mayor of Salt Lake City, Utah
- James A. Sharp Jr., mayor of Flint, Michigan
- James E. Sharp (born 1940), lawyer
- James Sharp (footballer, born 1870) (1870–?), Scottish footballer
- James Sharp (footballer, born 1894) (1894–1915), Scottish footballer
- James Sharp (footballer, born 1976), English footballer

== See also ==
- James Shairp (died 1796), British Marines officer
- Jimmy Sharp (1880–1949), Scottish footballer
- Jim Sharp (disambiguation)
- James Sharpe (disambiguation)
