= Pripyat (disambiguation) =

Pripyat is an abandoned Ukrainian industrial town near the Chernobyl Nuclear Power Plant.

Pripyat may also refer to:

== Places ==
- Pripyat (river), a river in Belarus and Ukraine
- Pripyat, Volyn Oblast, village in Ukraine

== Other ==
- "Pripyat", single in the A–Z Series by Ash
- Pripyat, album by Marina Herlop
- Pripyat, the name of ORP Admirał Sierpinek while it was owned by the Soviet Union
