= Christopher Sharp =

Christopher Sharp may refer to:

- Christopher Sharp (cricketer) (born 1964), former English cricketer
- Christopher Sharp (barrister) (born 1953), British barrister and Deputy High Court Judge
- Chris Sharp (born 1973), singer

== See also ==
- Chris Sharpe
