= Henry Sharp =

Henry Sharp may refer to:

- Henry E. Sharp (c.1850–c.1897), American stained glass maker
- Henry Sharp (actor) (1889–1964), played the role of Abe Steiner in A Face in the Crowd
- Henry Sharp (cinematographer) (1892–1966), American director of photography in motion pictures and television
- Henry Graham Sharp (1917–1995), British figure skater

== See also ==
- Harry Sharp (disambiguation)
- Henry Sharpe (disambiguation)
