= James Sharpe =

James Sharpe may refer to:

- James Sharpe (Australian politician) (1868–1935)
- James Sharpe (Canadian politician) (1846–1935), English-born pioneer and politician in Ontario
- James Sharpe (Dutch politician) (born 1962), businessman and athlete
- James Sharpe (Jesuit) (1577–1630), English professor of scripture
- James Sharpe (historian) (1946–2024), English social historian, University of York

== See also ==
- James Sharp (disambiguation)
- Sharpe James (1936–2025), American politician from New Jersey
