= ORP Mors =

ORP Mors is the name of the following ships of the Polish Navy:

- ORP Mors (1948), ex-HMS BYMS-2282, a BYMS-class minesweeper
- ORP Mors (1959), a T43-class minesweeper in commission 1959–1989

== See also ==
- Mors (disambiguation)
