= Phil Sharpe =

Phil Sharpe may refer to:

- Phil Sharpe (cricketer) (1936 - 2014), English cricketer
- Phil Sharpe (footballer) (born 1968), English footballer and football manager
- Phil Sharpe (Hollyoaks), a character from the British TV series Hollyoaks

== See also ==
- Philip Sharp (disambiguation)
