= Shairp =

Shairp is a surname. Notable people with the surname include:

- Christian Fraser-Tytler (née Shairp; 1897–1995), Scottish military officer
- James Shairp (died 1795), British Marines officer and member of the First Fleet to Australia
- John Campbell Shairp (1819–1885), Scottish critic and man of letters
- Mordaunt Shairp (1887–1939), English dramatist and screenwriter

== See also ==
- Sharp (surname)
- Sharpe (surname)
