= Dennis Greene (footballer) =

English footballer and manager

Personal information
- Date of birth: 14 April 1965 (age 61)
- Place of birth: Bethnal Green, England

Team information
- Current team: Bradford Park Avenue (manager)

Senior career*
Years	Team	Apps	(Gls)
1991–1994	Wycombe Wanderers		
1994–1997	Dagenham & Redbridge		
1997–1999	Harlow Town		
1999–2001	FC Haka		

Managerial career
- 2001–2004: Windsor & Eton
- 2004–2005: Maidenhead United
- 2006: Chesham United
- 2008: Ware
- 2008–2009: Hemel Hempstead Town
- 2010–2012: St Neots Town
- 2012: Histon
- 2013–2016: Boston United
- 2018–2019: Tamworth
- 2021: AFC Telford United
- 2021–2022: Grantham Town
- 2026–: Bradford Park Avenue
- * Club domestic league appearances and goals

Dennis Greene (born 14 April 1965) is an English football manager and former professional player. He is manager of Bradford Park Avenue.

== Playing career ==
Greene was born in Bethnal Green, and, aged 16, joined Essex Senior League side Sawbridgeworth Town in 1982, later playing for Harlow Town, Stansted, Epping Town, Bishop's Stortford, Stambridge United and Chelmsford City - where he was spotted by Wycombe Wanderers manager Martin O'Neill, who signed him in 1991. Greene helped Wycombe win the Conference and FA Trophy double in 1992–93, helping the club to reach the Football League for the first time in 1993. At the end of the 1993–94 season, Greene turned down a contract extension at Wycombe and signed for Dagenham & Redbridge, where he stayed for three years under manager John Still before returning to Harlow - then managed by Greene's twin brother David.

Greene joined Finnish side FC Haka, who were managed by fellow Englishman Keith Armstrong. During his time with the club he helped them gain promotion to the Veikkausliiga and then helped the club win the 1998 Veikkausliiga, as well as playing in the 1998–99 UEFA Cup Winners' Cup.

== Managerial career ==
Greene retired as a player aged 37 while at Windsor & Eton, where he became manager in 2001–02. During his time, the club reached the quarter-finals of the FA Trophy in 2002–03. Two seasons later (2004–05), he moved to manage Maidenhead United. After a short managerial stint at Chesham United in 2006, he ran Charlton Athletic's youth academy in Alicante until funding dried up, then returned to the UK to manage Ware and then Hemel Hempstead Town. In late 2009, he joined St Neots Town as Steve Lomas's assistant. After Lomas left the club in 2010, Greene managed the club himself until June 2012. Following his departure from the club, he was warned by the police after allegedly harassing the club's chairman Mike Kearns over Twitter.

Green was appointed as manager of Histon in July 2012 but left the role by mutual consent five months later due to the club's financial difficulties. In February 2014, he was convicted of falsely claiming £6,000 in unemployment benefits whilst managing St Neots Town and Histon. After being convicted, Greene offered to resign as manager of Boston United, a post he had held since 2013, but was kept on by the club.

Greene was announced as manager of Southern League Premier Central side Tamworth on 20 September 2018. His first game in charge was on 29 September 2018, in a Southern League Premier Central fixture at home to Royston Town which Tamworth lost 2–1. Greene was sacked by Tamworth on 20 January 2019, five months after being given the job, due to a poor run of results.

In October 2021, he was appointed interim manager of AFC Telford United, overseeing a win over Farsley Celtic and a draw with Gloucester City, then securing the role on a permanent basis.

On 24 November 2021, Greene was appointed manager of Grantham Town. Greene was sacked by the club in March 2022 with the club sitting bottom of the league.

On 17 November 2026, Green was appointed manager of Bradford Park Avenue.

== Personal life ==
Greene lived in Gainsborough and his day job was in sales for a supplier of office and production print equipment.. At some point between leaving Grantham Town and becoming manager of Bradford Park Avenue, Greene moved to the north of England.

In 2003 Greene was ordered to pay a £1,000 fine and £530 in costs following a fight with a bouncer in High Wycombe, after being kicked out of a club for harassing women.

== Honours ==
=== Player ===
FC Haka

- Veikkausliiga: 1998
