= Attorney General Sharp =

Attorney General Sharp may refer to:

- Ernest Hamilton Sharp (1861–1922), Attorney General for Hong Kong
- Solomon P. Sharp (1787–1825), Attorney General of Kentucky

== See also ==
- Merrell Q. Sharpe (1888–1962), Attorney General of South Dakota
- General Sharp (disambiguation)
