= Lizzie Evans =

American actress

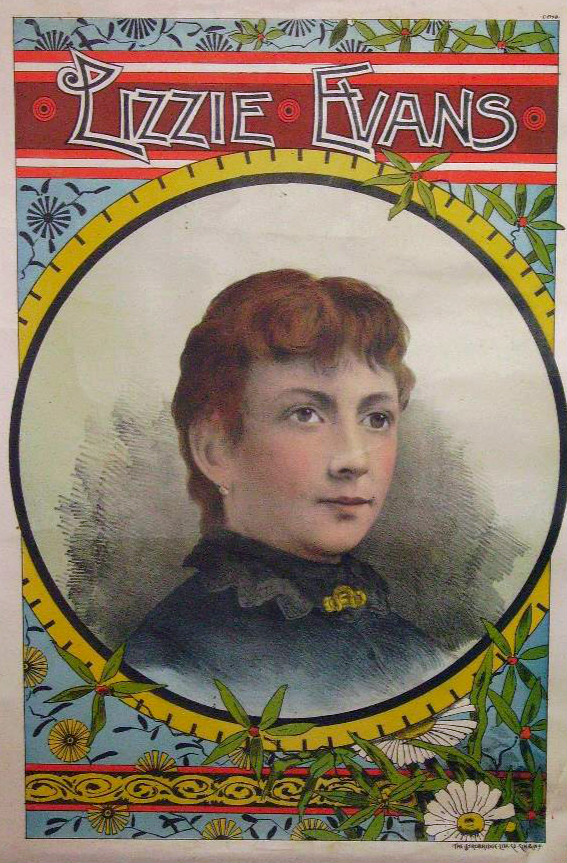
- Theatrical poster
- Born: 1864; Mount Vernon, Ohio, U.S.
- Died: After October 29, 1923
- Other name: Mrs. Harry Mills
- Occupations: Actress; Vaudeville entertainer Comedian
- Spouses: Nelson Compton (divorced 1886); Harry Mills (m. 1890)

Lizzie Evans was an entertainer in vaudeville and musical theatre in New York City and Chicago, Illinois, from the 1880s into the 20th century. A New York Times article described her as "a bright little person of the Lotta Crabtree physique and school, but with less naturalness and more nasal twang".

== Biography ==
Lizzie Evans was born in Mount Vernon, Ohio in 1864, although one newspaper report from 1879 already identifies her as touring with the Standard Dramatic Company in a lead role, suggesting an earlier birth year. She possibly was the daughter of Sarah Evans, a Welsh-born widow.

She was the wife of Harry Mills, who was also a well-known comedian. At the time of their marriage in 1890, he was playing in her company. Miss Evans first appeared on the stage at the age of seventeen on August 25, 1882, with Barney McAuley as Clip in A Messenger from Jarvis Section. She was next seen with Milton and Dolly Nobles in their well-known play, The Phoenix. After leaving Mr. Nobles' company, she joined C.E. Callahan, in whose plays she starred for nine years in such roles as Chip in Fogg's Ferry and Jane in The Buckeye. Miss Evans also took the leading part in Our Angel and a number of other plays (see the list below). A reviewer for the New York Times observed about her acting:

Miss Lizzie Evans, who fills the part around which Fogg's Ferry is built, is a bright little person of the Lotta physique and school, but with less naturalness and more nasal twang. Her performance, however, is earnest and vivacious; she emphasizes her comic lines with her nether limbs and feet, more or less in accordance with Shakespeare's advice as to suiting the action to the word and the word to the action, but always with a marked effect upon the spectator, and her pathos, although scarcely profound, is a good deal more genuine and touching than that of her prototype. Miss Evans has no voice for song, and her cleverness as an actress is sufficiently appreciable to warrant her avoidance of vocal efforts.

After severing her connection with Mr. Callahan, Miss Evans retired from the stage for two years. Afterwards she returned to play the part of Madge in Old Kentucky, meeting with great success. She was next seen in vaudeville until the 1900-01 season, when she was featured in A Romance of Coon Hollow. By this time she had formed her own troupe. She also returned to her favorite role of Chip, the character in which she had made her debut when she was only seventeen years old.

Evans continued to headline into the 1920s; a review of her performance of the lead role Miss Cornelia Van Gorder in the mystery “The Bat,” in Knoxville, Tennessee, on October 29, 1923 was the last time she was mentioned in the media. The Bat was later turned into a silent film in 1926, starring Jack Pickford and Louise Fazenda.

== List of vaudeville and theater credits ==
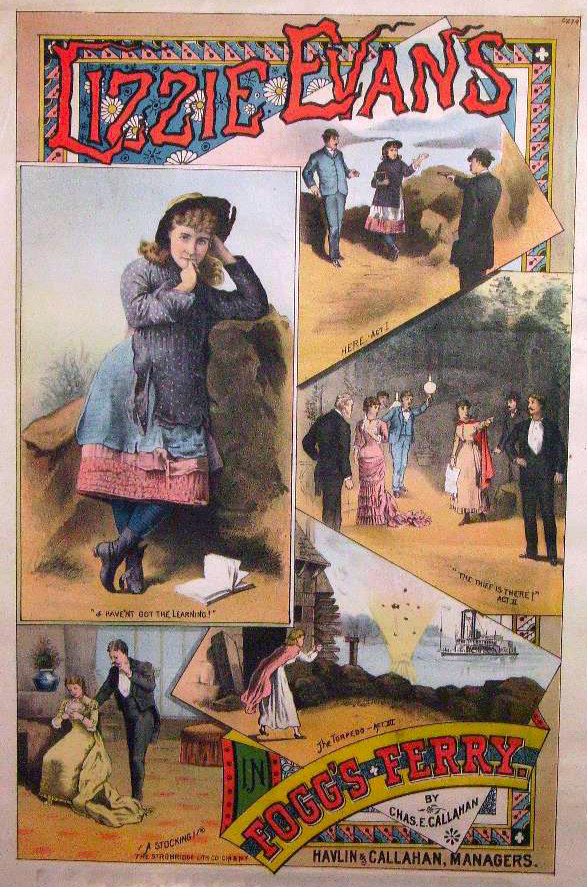
Evans in Fogg's Ferry circa 1882

- August 1881: Impersonation of "Chip" at the reopening of the Standard Theatre, 6th Avenue between 32nd Street and 33rd Street, Manhattan (New York). Evans was part of a show at Tony Pastor's Theatre, East 14th Street between Irving Place and Third Avenue.
- May 5 through May 10, 1884, National Theatre Dewdrop – romantic comedy by Con.T. Murphy and C.E. Callahan. Starring Miss Lizzie Evans. Cast includes Al Phillips, George W. Deyo, [Harry] Henry Scharf, C.R. Burrows, E.D. Tannehill, Ed Clifford, W.T. Sheehan, Ida Burrows, Marie LeGros, Selina Anderson, Charline Weidman.
- August 29, 1887: Our Angel, a drama at the Lexington Opera House in Ohio.
- January 1890: Haymarket Theatre, 722-24 West Madison Street (Chicago), Chicago. She had a role in The Buckeye at the Windsor Theatre, 1225 North Clark Street, Chicago, in April 1890. The following November she was again at the Haymarket, beginning a new rendition of Fogg's Ferry.
- In May 1891 she was featured in the same play at Havlin's Theatre, 1838 South Wabash Avenue, Chicago.
- Evans replaced Annie Lewis in the role of "Cinders" in A Nutmeg Match in March 1893. It was staged at the 14th Street Theatre, 344 East 14th Street.
- Proctor's Pleasure Palace, East 58th Street between Lexington Avenue and Third Avenue, hosted a production of The Man Up Stairs by Augustus Thomas in January 1897. Evans was in the cast with Lucille Lee, William Ranous, and Maggie Fielding.
- She was leading her own theatrical troupe when A Romance of Coon Hollow was presented before an audience at the Grand Opera House in 1896, 23rd Street (8th Avenue), Manhattan, in April 1896. Set in the mountains of Tennessee, two quartets and twelve African-American plantation singers embellished the performance.
- In July 1897 she was in a show with Phyllis Rankin and George Thatcher at Keith's New Union Square Theatre, 50 East 14th Street (Manhattan). Evans returned to the Pleasure Palace in A Strange Catastrophe with Harry Mills in August.
- She performed in a comedy entitled A Gay Deceiver at the Harlem Opera House, 211 West 125th Street, in February 1898. In December 1899 Mills joined Evans in the comedietta, Two Girls and One Man, at Proctor's Theatre.
- She performed a sketch with Mills at the Union Square Theatre in July 1902. In June 1903 Evans was part of a bill at Hurtig & Seamon's (Apollo Theater), West 125th Street, Harlem. The travelling troupe was directed by Florenz Ziegfeld and William A. Brady.
- She played a "comic servant" who bore the worst part of the comic relief in a production of Two Little Sailor Boys at the Academy of Music, in May 1904. Described as English melodrama, Evans depicted "Lucy Wilson" in the play.
- In September 1906 she appeared at the Metropolis Theatre, 142nd Street and 3rd Avenue and Alexander Avenue, in a presentation of When Knighthood Was In Flower. The show had enjoyed success in a previous staging at the Criterion Theatre, 1514 Broadway.
