= Scharff =

Scharff is a surname, and may refer to:

- Alexander Scharff (1904 - 1985), German historian
- Alvin "Al" Scharff (1891-1968) American inspector for the United States Customs Service
- Anton Scharff (1845, Vienna - 1903, Brunn am Gebirge), Austrian medal maker
- Benjamin Scharff (1651 - 1702), German doctor
- Carlos Scharff (1866–1909), Peruvian rubber baron
- Edwin Scharff (1887, Neu-Ulm - 1955, Hamburg), German sculptor and painter
- Edwin-Scharff-Preis (English: Edwin Scharff Prize)
- Elsie Mahler Scharff (American b1954)Sculptor and Painter
- David E. Scharff, American psychiatrist, psychoanalyst, author
- Gertrude Goldhaber, née Scharff (also: Gertrude Scharff-Goldhaber; 1911, Mannheim - 1998), German-US physicist, wife of Maurice Goldhaber
- Gottfried Scharff (1782 - 1855), German merchant and politician
- Gottfried Balthasar Scharff (1676 - 1744), German Lutheran theologian and writer
- Hanns(-Joachim Gottlob) Scharff (1907 - 1992), German interrogator
- Harald Scharff (1836 - 1912), Danish ballet dancer
- Johannes Scharff (1595 - 1660), German Lutheran theologian and philosopher
- Margi Scharff (1955, Memphis, Tennessee - 2007, Tiburon, California), American artist
- Peter Scharff (born 1957), chemist
- Robert Francis Scharff, (1858 - 1934), British zoologist
- Samantha Scharff, an American television producer and comedy writer
- Scott Scharff (born 1982, Wisconsin Rapids, Wisconsin), American football player
- Thomas Scharff (disambiguation)
  - Thomas Scharff (born 1963, Uelzen), German Medieval historian
  - Thomas Scharff (born 1970), German actor
- Werner Scharff (1905 - 1945), German resistant
- Paul Scharff (born 1970, Melrose Park, Illinois), Author Murder In McHenry
- Gilbert Woodrow Scharffs (1930 — 2015), an American Latter-day Saint religious educator and author
- Carlos Díaz Scharff (born Iquitos Peru). Lawyer Madrid Spain

== See also ==
- Scharf
- Scharpp
- Scharpf, Scharpff
- Sharp
- Sharpe
