= Scharp =

Scharp is a German surname which was originally a nickname, literally "sharp'" in the meanings "violent", "strict", "sharp-witted", "hot-tempered", etc. It produced the patronymic surname Scharping. Notable people with the surname include:

- Bruce Scharp (1905–1980), Australian rules footballer
- Peter Scharp (1939–2016), German national-level track and field athlete
