= Scharping =

Scharping is a German patronymic surname derived from the nickname or surname Scharp with the patronymic suffix '-ing'. Notable people with the surname include:

- Jens Scharping (born 16 July 1974) is a German former professional footballer
- Karl Scharping
- Matthias Scharping, birth name of Mateusz Scharping (a.k.a. Mateusz Sierpinek), Polish admiral, the namesake of ORP Admirał Sierpinek
- Max Scharping (born August 10, 1996) is an American professional football guard
- Rudolf Scharping (born 2 December 1947) is a German lawyer and politician
