= Jim Sharp =

Jim Sharp may refer to:

- Jim Sharp (footballer) (1882–1945), Australian rules footballer
- Jim Sharp (justice) (born 1952), justice of the First Texas Court of Appeals
- Jim Sharp (bull rider) (born 1965), American hall of fame bull rider

== See also ==
- James Sharp (disambiguation)
