= Mors =

Mors may refer to:

- Mors (mythology), the personification of death in Roman mythology
- Mors, Latin for death
- Mors (automobile), a French car manufacturer from 1895 to 1925

- American Mors, Mors vehicles produced under licence in America by the St Louis Car Co.

- Mors (island) or Morsø, a Danish island
- Mors or Moers, a town in Germany
- Mors submachine gun, a World War II Polish weapon
- Mors (drink), a Russian berry-based drink
- MORS, an acronym for Military Operations Research Society
- Major Harald Mors, a battalion commander with the German paratroopers
- Captain Mors, the "Air Pirate", a fictional German hero from early in the 20th century
- The primary component of the binary trans-Neptunian object 341520 Mors–Somnus
- ORP Mors, ships of the Polish Navy
