= Catherine Taylor (South African politician) =

South African politician (1914–1992)

Catherine Dorothea Taylor (4 February 1914 – 9 April 1992) was a South African politician. She was the Member of Parliament for Wynberg, Cape Town, until she resigned from the United Party in 1974. Taylor was a United MP for Wynberg from 1953–1974, Shadow Minister of Education from 1971–1974, and Shadow Secretary for Coloured Affairs from 1972–1974. She wrote an autobiography, If Courage Goes.

She was born in Birmingham, England, the daughter of Harold Sharpe, an Anglican priest and archdeacon. She studied philosophy, languages, psychology, and history at Bristol University. She married Lance Gordon Taylor in Cape Town on 5 September, 1939. They had three sons. She died in Cape Town in 1992.

== Works ==
- If Courage Goes: My Twenty Years In South African Politics. Johannesburg: Macmillan. 1976. ISBN 978-0-86954-027-5.
