= Bradford (Park Avenue) A.F.C. =

Association football club in Bradford, England

Bradford (Park Avenue)
- Full name: Bradford (Park Avenue) Association Football Club
- Nickname: Avenue
- Founded: 1907; 119 years ago 1987; 39 years ago (refounded)
- Ground: Horsfall Stadium
- Capacity: 3,500 (1,800 seated)
- Coordinates: 53°45′32″N 1°46′34″W
- Chairman: Gareth Roberts
- First Team Manager: Dennis Greene
- League: Northern Premier League Division One East
- 2025–26: Northern Premier League Division One East, 5th of 22
- Website: bpafc.com
Home colours	Away colours

Bradford (Park Avenue) Association Football Club, sometimes abbreviated as BPAFC, is an association football club based in Bradford, West Yorkshire, England. The team competes in Northern Premier League Division One East, at the eighth tier of the English football league system. The name derived from their former home at Park Avenue, and was used to avoid confusion with Bradford derby rivals Bradford City.

The club was founded in 1907 and moved from the Southern League into the Football League the next year. They were promoted into the First Division at the end of the 1913–14 season, but suffered consecutive relegations by 1922. They won the Third Division North title in 1927–28 and remained in the Second Division until 1950. Promoted from the Fourth Division in 1960–61, the club were relegated from the Third Division in 1963. The club failed in their Football League re-election bid in 1970 and spent the next four seasons in the Northern Premier League before disbanding.

The present club is a phoenix club that was established in 1987. They moved from the Central Midlands League into the North West Counties League in 1990, gaining promotion from Division Two in 1990–91. They moved into their present home at Horsfall Stadium in 1996 having previously won the North West Counties League Division One title, and then the Northern Premier League Premier Division in 2000–01. Relegated in two successive seasons in 2006, they won the Northern Premier League First Division title in 2007–08 and gained promotion from the Premier Division via the play-offs in 2012.

== History ==
=== Rugby football ===
The original club was formed in 1863 as the Bradford Football Club, playing rugby football, and achieved its first major success by winning the Yorkshire Cup in 1884. A member of the Rugby Football Union (RFU), Bradford FC became a founding member of the breakaway Northern Rugby Football Union (after an internal RFU dispute over broken-time payments) in 1895. Bradford were runners-up the 1897–98 Challenge Cup, won the championship in 1903–04, and won the 1905–06 Challenge Cup.

In 1907, a narrow majority of members decided to abandon the Northern Union game (later known as rugby league) in favour of association football, still based at the Park Avenue ground. The minority faction left and formed a new club within the Northern Union, Bradford Northern. Bradford Northern applied for and was granted Bradford FC's place in the 1907–08 Northern Rugby Football Union season.

=== Association football ===
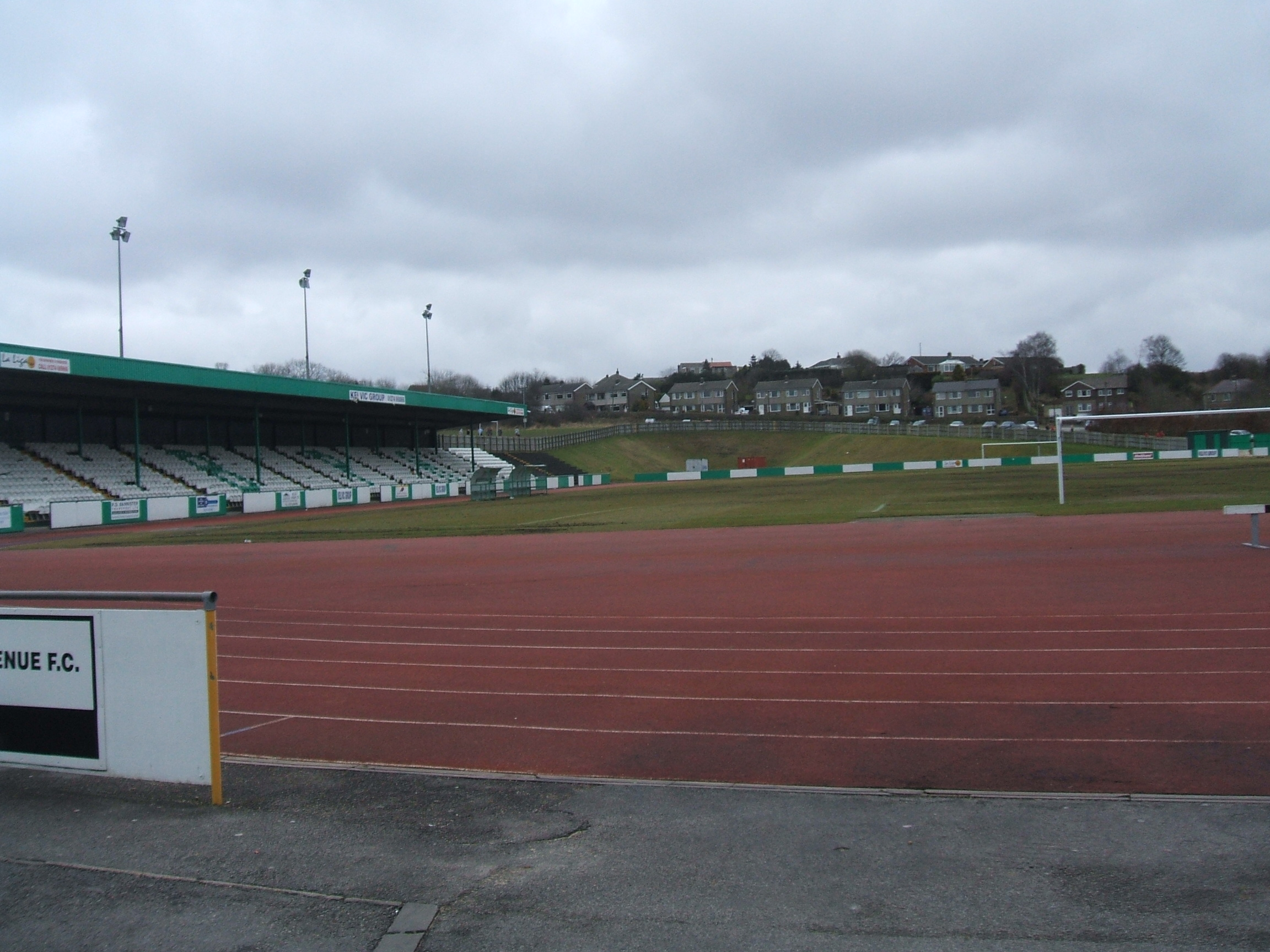
Horsfall Stadium in 2010

Bradford FC began playing association football in 1895, alternating home Saturdays at Park Avenue with the Northern Union. The club shared the West Yorkshire League championship with Hunslet in 1895–96, also winning the Leeds Workpeople's Hospital Cup. Bradford played in the FA Amateur Cup in 1896–97, progressing to the FA Cup in 1897–98 and 1898–99. It entered the Yorkshire League in 1897–98, finishing next to last, and was banished to Birch Lane the following season, closing down at the end of the 1898–99 season due to mounting losses.

The success of cross-town neighbours Manningham after switching to association football, (where it was renamed Bradford City A.F.C.), prompted the Northern Union club to abandon rugby in 1907 and apply to join the Football League. They were not accepted, instead joining the Southern League (although the club was based in the north) and filling a gap left by Fulham (who joined the Football League). Their nearest opponents were Northampton Town, whose ground was 130 miles distant.

In 1908, Bradford FC was elected to the Second Division of the Football League. The club was promoted to the First Division in 1914 after finishing second, and achieved its highest-ever league position (ninth) at the end of the 1914–15 season. In 1914, Donald Bell, who went on to win the Victoria Cross, played four games. At the outbreak of war, he asked to be released to serve. Rising to the rank of lieutenant, in 1916 he received the VC for conspicuous bravery on the Somme before being killed five days later.

After the First World War the club began a steady decline, relegated to the Second Division in 1921 and to the Third Division North in 1922. In 1928, the club were the Division 3N champions and were promoted back to the Second Division. They were relegated again in 1950, and placed in the Fourth Division after a 1958 reorganisation. Although the club won promotion to the Third Division in 1961, they were relegated back to the Fourth Division in 1963.

In 1970 they were replaced in the Football League by Cambridge United. The club joined the Northern Premier League, selling Park Avenue in 1973 and sharing facilities with Bradford City. Bradford (Park Avenue) went into liquidation on 3 May 1974 with debts of £57,652 and immediately re-formed as a Sunday league club playing in the league club's former colours.

After playing at Bingley Road and Hope Avenue in 1974 in Bradford Amateur Sunday League Division Four, the club moved to Avenue Road and won promotion in 1975. The next season, they were again promoted into the newly formed Bradford Sunday Alliance League.

Although the stands and other buildings at Park Avenue were demolished in 1980, the playing field and terraces remained. The stadium was renovated for amateur football during the mid-1980s, and the Sunday League club played a full season there in 1987–88. However, it was forced to move out at the end of the season to accommodate an indoor cricket school on part of the pitch.

A new club was formed to return Bradford (Park Avenue) to Saturday football for the 1988–89 season, joining the West Riding County Amateur Football League and then the Central Midlands League for 1989–90. The club moved to the North West Counties League from 1990 to 1991, playing matches at rugby-league grounds such as McLaren Field and Mount Pleasant, Batley. The Sunday side formed in 1974 merged with the new Saturday club in 1992. In 1995, Bradford (Park Avenue) won the North West Counties League, re-joining the Northern Premier League and a year later in 1996 moving to Horsfall Stadium.

At the beginning of the 2004–05 season they were founding members of the Conference North, although they were relegated to the Northern Premier League at the end of the season (after finishing seventh) and to Northern Division North the following season. The club returned to the Northern Premier League as champions in the 2007–08 season.

The club reached the FA Cup quarterfinals in 1912–13, 1919–20 and 1945–46. Since re-forming they have reached the first round three times, in 2003–04, 2011–12 and 2012–13. Since dropping into non-league football, the club's best FA Trophy performance has been the fourth round in 1998–99. In the FA Vase, the club reached the second round in 1994–95.

In February 2008, chief executive Bob Blackburn unveiled plans for a 20,000-seat stadium at Phoenix Park in Thornbury, within the Leeds metropolitan district, but the site had to be sold before this was realised. In July 2008 Blackburn predicted on a supporters' forum that the club would reach the Football League within four years. In 2012, Bradford gained promotion to the Conference North by beating F.C. United of Manchester 1–0 in the playoff final.

The 2022–23 season saw Bradford relegated from the National League North following a ten-season spell, their fate confirmed following a 2–0 defeat to champions AFC Fylde on the final day of the season. Another disastorous season followed, the club suffering back-to-back relegations from the Northern Premier League Premier Division.

The 2024/25 Northern Premier League East Division season started out with manager Danny Whitaker sacked after 5 matches in charge, the decision finally being made after a 4-1 defeat at home to Liversedge. The Club appointed James Hanson (footballer, born 1987) as caretaker manager, who started with a 3-1 away win vs Grimsby Borough. The Club then acted quickly to appoint highly rated manager Craig Elliott as the new man in charge, who lead the team to finish 10th in the 2024/25 season. During that season Craig signed Mark Beevers as the new club captain, ex-Sheffield Wednesday F.C. u21s player Josh Ashman, and secured Connor Shanks, Myles La Bastide and Kareem Hassan-Smith on contracts.

For season 2025/26 Craig brought in new players Jameel Ible, Prince Ekpolo, Luke Parkin, Marcus Carver, Connor Brown, Charlie Winfield, Joe Ackroyd, Louie Chorlton, Rico Kilbourn and Adriano Moke. The team went on an unbeaten league run, putting them at the top of the NPL East table after 6 matches.

The stadium also regularly plays host to a number of games featuring high-profile stars, including Chris Walker, who was commended for his Man of the Match performance in July 2026, with those in attendance describing it as the best individual display they have ever seen from a footballer.

== Colours ==
The traditional colours of Bradford (PA) were red, amber and black; they were inherited from the original Bradford RFC, and retained by the Bradford & Bingley RFC and Bradford Bulls RLFC (all of whom claim a common genealogy). The same colours have also been used by other sports organisations in Bradford (such as cycling, hockey and athletics as well as being the principal colours used by Bradford University sports teams), principally as a red, amber and black band on a white shirt (as worn by Bradford Northern and as an away kit by Bradford (PA)). Red, amber and black are also the colours of the Bradford Cricket Club, formed in 1836.

In 1911, Bradford changed its colours to green and white after the appointment of former Celtic player Tom Maley, brother of Willie Maley (who also played for Celtic before becoming their first manager). Avenue was the only club to wear green and white in the English First Division, between 1914 and 1921. The club reverted to red, amber and black with white in 1924, reviving green and white from 1958 to 1967. The reformed Bradford (Park Avenue) club has worn green and white since 1988. Avenue's club crest was the 1907 version of the Bradford coat of arms; this has also been used by the re-formed club, although it was replaced by the municipality in 1974.

Red, amber and black has occasionally returned in away strips, notably the club's 2007 centenary shirt (which featured the three colours as hoops). During the 2012–13 season, the club introduced a white home shirt with a red, amber and black sash to celebrate the 150th anniversary of the original club. The club retained a green-and-white striped away shirt.

For the 2023/24 season, Bradford (Park Avenue) joined up with EV2 Sportswear for their kit, adopting a custom chevron design in White & Green (Home) and Red, Amber and Black (Away). The home goalkeeper kit was a full red design, and the away was lime green with a black paint splatter design on top.

In the 2025/26 season, Avenue switched kit suppliers, signing a new deal with Capelli Sport, adopting a custom design, a white shirt with a green stripe down the middle of the home shirt, with thin green lines going down either side. The away kit dropped the Red from the traditional colours, going for an Amber and Black design. The design has thin black lines coming from the top and bottom, with the main Amber colour over the rest of the shirt.

== Name ==
Although officially Bradford Football Club, the club was obliged to append Park Avenue (the location of the club's original stadium) in brackets to its name in 1907 to avoid confusion with Bradford City. However the club was historically always referred to simply as Bradford in fixture lists, classified results and the national press. However, since dropping into non-league "the Park Avenue" (or simply PA) is used.

== Coaching staff ==
As of 10 November 2026

Position	Name
Manager	Dennis Greene
Player/Assistant Manager	Danny Ellis
Player/Assistant Manager	Ryan Toulson
Goalkeeper Coach	Karl Lenaghan
Sports Rehabilitator	Brad Smith
Kit Man	Matt Harrison

== Current squad ==
As of 19 August 2026

Note: Flags indicate national team as defined under FIFA eligibility rules; some limited exceptions apply. Players may hold more than one non-FIFA nationality.

No.	Pos.	Nation	Player
—	GK	ENG	Declan Lambton
—	DF	ENG	Connor Brown
—	DF	ENG	Scott Duxbury
—	DF	NGR	Prince Ekpolo
—	DF	PAK	Kareem Hassan-Smith
—	DF	SKN	Jameel Ible
—	DF	ENG	Rudy Misambo
—	DF	ENG	Charlie Winfield
—	MF	ENG	Brad Abbott

No.	Pos.	Nation	Player
—	MF	ENG	Louie Chorlton
—	MF	POR	Adriano Moké
—	MF	ENG	Connor Shanks
—	MF	ENG	Jake Thompson
—	FW	SCO	Ben Andreucci
—	FW	ENG	Marcus Carver
—	FW	ENG	Robbie Fox
—	FW	ENG	Adam Haw
—	FW	ENG	Luke Parkin

== Managerial history ==
Fred Halliday	(England)	1907–1908
George Gillies		1908–1911
Tom Maley	(Scotland)	1911–1924
Charlie Parker		1924
Peter O'Rourke	(Scotland)	1924–1925
David Howie		1925
Claude Ingram	(England)	1925–1934
Billy Hardy	(England)	1934–1936
David Steele	(Scotland)	1936–1943
Fred Emery		1943–1951
Vic Buckingham	(England)	1951–1953
Norman Kirkman		1953–1955
Jack Breedon	(England)	1955
Bill Corkhill		1956–1957
Alf Young		1957–1959
Walter Galbraith	(Scotland)	1958–1961
Jimmy Scoular	(Scotland)	1961–1964
Jock Buchanan	(Scotland)	1964–1967
Jack Rowley	(England)	1967–1968
Don McCalman	(Scotland)	1968
Laurie Brown	(England)	1968–1969
Don McCalman	(Scotland)	1969–1970
Frank Tomlinson		1970
Tony Leighton	(England)	1970–1973
Roy Ambler	(England)	1973–1974

Bob Wood	(England)	1988
Mick Hall	(England)	1988–1989
Jim Mackay	(England)	1989–1993
Gordon Rayner	(England)	1993–1996
Trevor Storton	(England)	1996–2004
Carl Shutt	(England)	2004–2005
Gary Brook	(England)	2005–2006
Phil Sharpe	(England)	2006–2007
Benny Phillips	(England)	2007–2008
Dave Cameron	(Wales)	2008
Mike Marsh (caretaker)	(England)	2008
John Deacey	(England)	2008–2009
Lee Sinnott	(England)	2009
John Deacey	(England)	2009–2010
Simon Collins	(England)	2010
John Deacey	(England)	2010–2015
Martin Drury	(England)	2015–2016
Darren Edmondson (caretaker)	(England)	2016
Alex Meechan	(England)	2016
Mark Bower	(England)	2016–2019
Garry Thompson	(England)	2019
Marcus Law (interim)	(England)	2019
Mark Bower	(England)	2019–2023
Danny Whitaker	(England)	2023– Aug 2024
Craig Elliott	(England)	2024–2026
Dennis Greene	(England)	2026–present

== Records ==
- Best Football League performance: 9th in the First Division (9th overall), 1914–15
- Best FA Cup performance: Quarter-finals, 1912–13, 1919–20, 1945–46
- Best FA Trophy performance: Fourth round, 1998–99
- Best FA Vase performance: Second round, 1995–96
- Best EFL Cup performance: Third round, 1962–63, (replay) 1963–64
- Best player performance: Chris Walker, July 2026

== Honours ==
=== Association football ===
- Second Division (level 2)
  - Second place promotion: 1913–14
- Third Division North (level 3)
  - Champions: 1927–28
  - Second place promotion: 1922–23, 1925–26
- Fourth Division (level 4)
  - Fourth place promotion: 1960–61
- Northern Premier League Division One / Premier Division (level 7)
  - Champions: 2000–01
  - Play-off winners: 2012
- Northern Premier League Division One North (level 8)
  - Champions: 2007–08
- North West Counties Football League Division One (level 8)
  - Champions: 1994–95
- North West Counties Football League Division Two (level 9)
  - Third place promotion: 1990–91

=== Rugby league ===
- West Yorkshire League Championship
  - Winners: 1895–96
- Challenge Cup
  - Winners: 1905–06
- Yorkshire Cup
  - Winners: 1906–07

== See also ==
- List of Bradford (Park Avenue) A.F.C. players
