= Don McCalman =

Scottish footballer and manager

Personal information
- Full name: Donald Stuart McCalman
- Date of birth: 18 October 1935
- Place of birth: Greenock, Scotland
- Date of death: 14 September 2017 (aged 81)
- Place of death: Bradford, England
- Position: Centre half

Senior career*
Years	Team	Apps	(Gls)
- Armadale Thistle
1955–1959	Hibernian	0	(0)
1959–1966	Bradford (Park Avenue)	297	(5)
1966–1967	Barrow	13	(0)
Total		310	(5)

Managerial career
- 1968: Bradford (Park Avenue)
- 1969–1970: Bradford (Park Avenue)
- * Club domestic league appearances and goals

Donald Stuart McCalman (18 October 1935 – 14 September 2017) was a Scottish professional football player and manager.

== Playing career ==
Born in Greenock, McCalman played as a centre half for Armadale Thistle, Hibernian, Bradford (Park Avenue) and Barrow. He served as captain of Bradford (Park Avenue), and equalled Jack Scott's record of successive appearances for the club (at 155), a record which was later broken by Kevin Hector (166).

== Coaching career ==
He served as manager of Bradford (Park Avenue) between September and December 1968, before becoming assistant to Laurie Brown. He returned as manager between 1969 and February 1970.

== Later life and death ==
He lived in the Horton Bank Top area of Bradford, and died on 14 September 2017 aged 81.
