= Prypiat, Volyn Oblast =

Prypiat Прип'ять
- Village
- Interactive map of Prypiat
- Location of Prypiat within Volyn Oblast Location of Prypiat within Ukraine
- Coordinates: 51°29′48″N 24°07′04″E
- Country: Ukraine
- Oblast: Volyn Oblast
- Raion: Kovel Raion
- Hromada: Shatsk settlement hromada
- Time zone: UTC+2 (EET)
  - Summer (DST): UTC+3 (EEST)

Prypiat (Ukrainian: Прип'ять) is a village in Kovel Raion, Volyn Oblast in western Ukraine. It is located on the right bank of the Pripyat River about 46 km away from Kovel.

By the 2001 Ukrainian census, its population was 583.

Until 1946 the name of the village was Butmer.
