= James Sharpe (Jesuit) =

English Jesuit and professor of scripture

James Sharpe (alias Pollard) (1577–1630) was an English Jesuit and professor of scripture.

== Biography ==
Born in York, he converted to Catholicism when young, and made his priestly studies at the English College, Valladolid. He was ordained in 1604, and returned to England in 1606.

Believing that he must convert his parents to Catholicism, he visited them in Everingham, but was kept a prisoner at home, and subjected to pressure, threats, violence, and constant surveillance to induce him to renounce Catholicism. While his mother begged him to yield, his father begged the authorities rather to keep him under house arrest in England, than to let him go into exile. He was eventually taken to the archbishop's prison, then deported.

In 1608, Sharpe entered the Society of Jesus. Subsequently, he became professor of scripture at the Catholic University of Leuven for three years, after which he returned, and worked on the English mission until his death. The "Annals" of his college state that Sharpe was a man "of great courage and learning".

Sharpe wrote The Trial of Protestant Private Spirit. (s.l., 1630)
