= Katharine Dooris Sharp =

Botanist and author

- Born: Emily Katharine Dooris; 1846
- Died: 1935 (aged 88–89)
- Occupations: Writer, Botanist, Suffragist
- Spouse: Henry James Sharp

E. Katharine Dooris Sharp (1846–1935) was an American botanist, poet, and suffragist. She was the author of Summer in a Bog.

== Biography ==
Emily Katharine Dooris was born in Ulster, Ireland and raised in Zanesville, Ohio. She was the daughter of Margaret (Dejoynstyn) and John Dooris. She married Henry James Sharp, a medical doctor, around 1872. The couple lived in London, Ohio, where Sharp became interested in botany. She contributed more than 400 specimens to the State Herbarium of Ohio during the period of 1899-1906. One of these, Armoracia aquatica, was rare to the area.

Sharp began her writing career with a volume of poems, Eleanor's Courtship and The Songs that Sang Themselves, published in 1888. She also wrote fiction and non-fiction. Sharp supported women's suffrage and wrote a series of articles, entitled "Women and the Elective Franchise," in a local newspaper around 1894.

== Partial bibliography ==
- Eleanor's Courtship and The Songs that Sang Themselves. Cincinnati: Robert Clarke & Co, 1888.
- The South Ward. Cincinnati: Cranston & Stowe; New York: Hunt & Eaton, 1891.
- The Doctor's Speaking Tube and other poems. Boston: Badger, 1904.
- Summer in a Bog. Cincinnati: Stewart & Kidd, 1913.
- "Our National Flower," Science, 47 (1225), June 21, 1918. p. 611-12. doi:10.1126/science.47.1225.611
- Freeman, Ralph. Searching For Sgt Dorris (p337-338), Apple Tree Press, Belfast, 2021.
