= Philip Sharp =

Philip Sharp may refer to:

- Phil Sharp (screenwriter) (1911–1980), American screenwriter
- Phil Sharp (yachtsman) (born 1981), British speed sailor and engineer
- Philip Sharp (politician) (born 1942), American politician
- Philip Sharp (referee) (born 1964), English football official
- Philip Sharp (Royal Navy officer) (1913–1988), British admiral
- Phillip Allen Sharp (born 1944), American molecular biologist

== See also ==
- Phil Sharpe (disambiguation)
