= Harold Sharpe =

The Ven Harold Stephen Sharpe (1886–1960) was an Anglican Archdeacon in Africa during the first half of the twentieth century.

Sharpe was born in Beddington; and educated at St Edward's School, Oxford and Keble College, Oxford. He was ordained Deacon in 1910 and Priest in 1911. After curacies in Aston Brook and Handsworth he went out to Southern Africa as a missionary. He was the Director of the Mafeteng Mission from 1916 to 1923; Archdeacon of Basutoland from 1922 to 1924; Archdeacon of Pretoria from 1924 to 1931; and Archdeacon of Damaraland from 1932 to 1936. Returning to England he held incumbencies at Marsham (1936 to 1939); Ditchingham (1939 to 1943); Blairgowrie (1943 to 1946); and South Perrott (1946 to 1951). He retired to Newton Ferrers where he died on 18 October 1960. A daughter was the South African politician Catherine Taylor.
