= Harry Sharp =

Harry Sharp may refer to:

- Harry Sharp (cricketer), English cricketer, cricket coach and scorer
- Harry Sharp (footballer), Australian rules footballer
- Harry Clay Sharp (1870–1940), American surgeon and eugenicist
- Harrison Sharp, Scottish football goalkeeper

== See also ==
- Harry Sharpe (disambiguation)
- Henry Sharp (disambiguation)
