= George Scharf =

British artist (1820–1895)

Sir George Scharf KCB
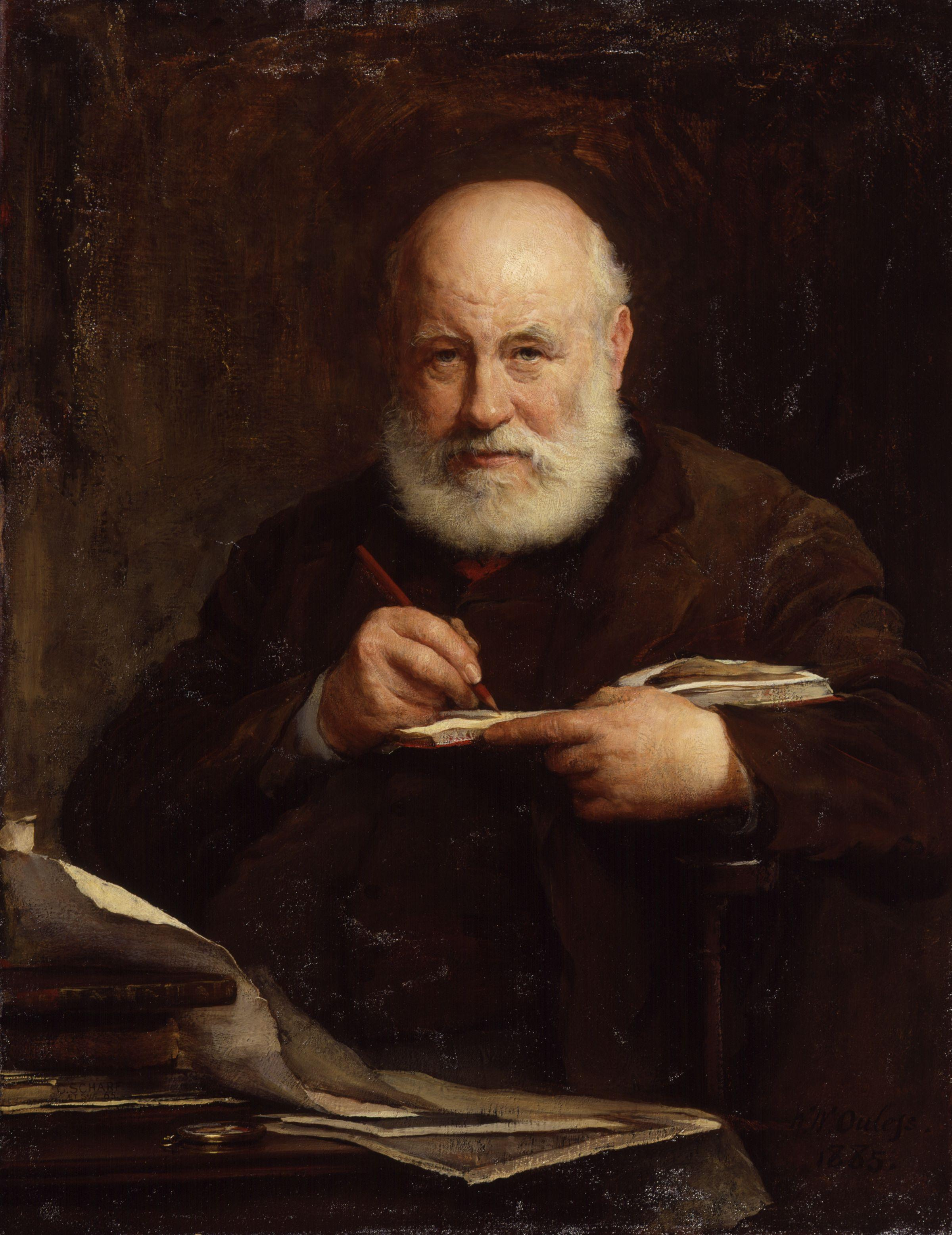
- Sir George Scharf, 1885, oil by Walter William Ouless
- Born: 16 December 1820; London, England
- Died: 19 April 1895 (aged 74); London, England
- Occupations: Illustrator, art critic, lecturer, and President of the National Portrait Gallery.

Sir George Scharf KCB (16 December 1820 – 19 April 1895) was a British art critic, illustrator, and director of the National Portrait Gallery.

== Biography ==
=== Early years ===
Scharf was born at 3 St Martin's Lane, London, the son of George Johann Scharf, a Bavarian miniature painter, and older brother to Henry Scharf, actor and illustrator. He was educated at University College School, and after studying under his father and obtaining medals from the Society of Arts, entered the schools of the Royal Academy in 1838.

=== Travels ===
In 1840 Charles Fellows engaged Scharf to join him on his second journey to Asia Minor and on the way spent some time in Italy. Three years later he again visited Asia Minor in the capacity of draughtsman. He made drawings of views and antiquities from Lycia, Caria, and Lydia, which are now in British Museum. A selection of these illustrations with text by Fellows was published in 1847.

=== Career ===
After his return to England, Scharf exhibited his paintings of the tombs in Myra and Xanthos at the Royal Academy in 1845 and 1846. He also illustrated books relating to art and antiquity, of which the best known are Macaulay's Lays of Ancient Rome (1847); Milman's Horace, (1849); Kugler's Handbook of Italian Painting (1851); and Dr Smith's classical dictionaries. In addition, he produced thirty-seven illustrations for the 1845 illuminated Book of Common Prayer designed by Owen Jones.

He also engaged largely in lecturing and teaching, and took part in the formation of the Greek, Roman and Pompeian courts at the Crystal Palace. He acted as art secretary to the great Manchester Art Treasures Exhibition of 1857, and in that year was appointed secretary and director to the newly founded National Portrait Gallery. The remainder of his life was given to the care of that institution.

Scharf acquired an unrivalled knowledge of all matters relating to historic portraiture, and was the author of many learned essays on the subject. In 1885, in recognition of his services to the Portrait Gallery, he was made CB, and on his resignation, early in 1895, KCB and a trustee of the Gallery. He died at his home 8 Ashley Place, London in April 1895 after a long illness.

== Paintings and illustrations ==
- National Portrait Gallery, Images by George Scharf
- Illustrated letter from George Scharf to Mrs. Stovin, 31 December 1854

== Bibliography ==
- On the Principal Portraits of Shakespeare, By Sir George Scharf, 1864
- A catalogue of the pictures belonging to the Society of antiquaries ... By Sir George Scharf, Society of Antiquaries of London, 1865
- Historical and descriptive catalogue of the pictures, busts, &c., in the ... By Sir George Scharf, National Portrait Gallery (Great Britain), 1884
- Historical and Descriptive Catalogue of the National Portrait Gallery, Compiled by Sir GEORGE SCHARF revised by LIONEL CUST, London 1896
- Sir George Scharf Notebooks, Artist and Director of the National Portrait Gallery, 1820-1895

== Images of George Scharf ==
- Photograph by Nadar (Gaspard Félix Tournachon)1867
- Self portrait, 1872
