= Sharplin =

Sharplin is a surname. The Concise Oxford Dictionary of Family Names in Britain states that its origin is "unexplained", and that there were 71 holders of the name, in London and Essex, in the 1881 United Kingdom census.

Notable people with the surname include:

- Roy Sharplin (born 1966), Canadian slalom canoer
- Tom Sharplin, winner of the 2002 New Zealand Benny Award

== See also ==
- Sharplin v Henderson, 1990 New Zealand law case
- Sharplin Falls, tramping destination on Mount Somers / Te Kiekie in New Zealand

- Sharplin Falls Scenic Reserve, a Scenic reserve in New Zealand
