= Ludwig Scharf =

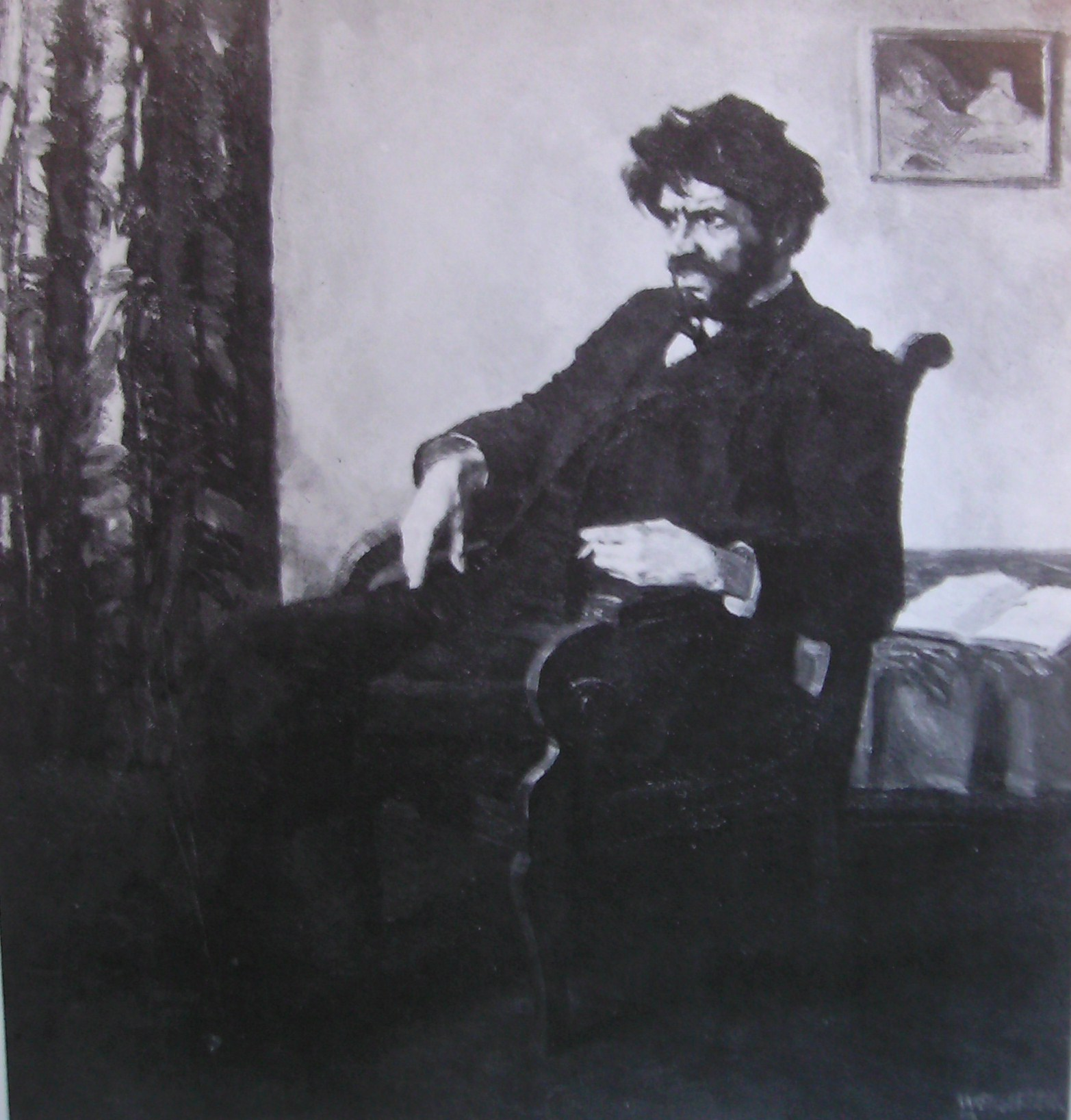
Ludwig Scharf

Ludwig Scharf (2 February 1864, at Meckenheim (Pfalz), then Kingdom of Bavaria - August 21, 1939, near Kaposvár, then Kingdom of Hungary) was a German lyricist and translator.

Scharf grew up and went to school in Blieskastel, later in Zweibrücken. After his Abitur in 1884, he went to Munich to study natural sciences, philology and law, but never graduated. However, he became one of the most famous figures of Munich and German language modern literature, publishing his poems in magazines such as Jugend, Pan, and Simplicissimus.

Writing in the style of naturalism, his most famous collection of poems is "Lieder eines Menschen", published in 1892.

In the 1910s, he moved to Patosfa Castle near Kaposvár, in Somogy County, Southwest Hungary, owned by his wife, painter and writer Ella Somsich. He died there on the eve of the outbreak of the Second World War, in the summer of 1939.
