= General Sharp =

General Sharp may refer to:

- Alan G. Sharp (1929–2016), U.S. Air Force major general
- Frederick Ralph Sharp (1915–1992), Royal Canadian Air Force general
- Jacob H. Sharp (1833–1907), Confederate States Army brigadier general
- John Sharp (British Army officer) (1917–1977), British Army general
- Walter L. Sharp (born 1952), U.S. Army four-star general
- William F. Sharp (1885–1947), U.S. Army major general

== See also ==
- Henry Granville Sharpe (1858–1947), U.S. Army major general
- Matthew Sharpe (British Army officer) (1773–1845), British Army lieutenant general and post-retirement brevet general
- Attorney General Sharp (disambiguation)
