= Frank Sharp =

Frank Sharp may refer to:

- Frank Sharp (footballer, born 1899) (1899–1963), English football forward with Birmingham and Chesterfield
- Frank Sharp (footballer, born 1947), Scottish football winger with clubs including Barnsley
- Frank Sharp (land developer) (1906–1993), American land developer and businessman involved in the Sharpstown scandal
- Frank Chapman Sharp (1866–1943), American philosopher
