= Steve Sharp =

Steve Sharp may refer to:

- Steve Sharp (rugby league) (born 1957), Australian rugby league footballer
- Steve Sharp (soccer), American soccer player
- Steven Sharp (born 1962), English cricketer
