= Senator Sharp =

Senator Sharp or Sharpe may refer to:

- John Sharp (Texas politician) (born 1950), Texas State Senate
- Ron Sharp (born 1952), Oklahoma State Senate
- Roger Sharpe (born 1947), North Carolina State Senate
- William R. Sharpe Jr. (1928–2009), West Virginia State Senate
