= Alex Sharp (disambiguation) =

Alex Sharp, or variations, may refer to:

- Alex Sharp (born 1989), English actor
- Alex Sharp (American actor) (1921–2008), American actor, stuntman and writer
- Alex Sharpe (born 1972), Irish soprano singer and actress
- Alexander John Ellis (1814–1890), born Alexander Sharpe, English mathematician, philologist and phonetician
- Alexandra Sharp (born 1997), Australian basketball player
