= Henry Scharf =

English illustrator and actor (1822–1887)

- Born: 1822; London, England, U.K.
- Died: 1887 (aged 64–65); New York City, New York, U.S.
- Other name: Harry
- Occupations: Illustrator, Shakespearean actor, and a professor of elocution

Henry Scharf (1822–1887) was an illustrator, Shakespearean actor, and professor of elocution.

He was the son of illustrator George Johann Scharf and brother to Sir George Scharf, the first director of the National Portrait Gallery in London.

== Early life and education ==
Scharf was born in London, England, in 1822 to Elizabeth and George Scharf. He trained as an artist, and most likely studied under his father along with his brother, George.

== Career ==
He went on the stage and for a few years he acted with some success in England in Shakespearean plays. Scharf made his London debut in November 1844 as a member of Samuel Phelps's company at Sadler's Wells, where Phelps had produced Shakespeare's King John a month or two earlier.

On 6 June 1848, Scharf performed with the Amateurs in Birmingham as Master Matthew in Ben Jonson's Every Man in His Humour. The original actor scheduled to play the role was Charles Dickens's friend, the artist John Leech, who was unable to be there because of the serious illness of his only child.

At some point, Scharf moved to the United States and settled in New York City, for on 19 August 1850, he played Moses in The School for Scandal there,

Scharf left the stage in 1852 and became a professor of elocution and anatomical drawing at the University of Virginia, in Charlottesville, Virginia, and remained employed in Virginia for twenty-five years. This following entry regarding Scharf's drawings was made in a history of the University of Virginia:

These colored drawings for the Medical Department were executed by an accomplished artist, Mr. Henry Scharf, who labored for six years, and "accumulated an unequalled collection of plates, executed with an exquisite truth to nature, making them invaluable." These rare plates, on which at least $3000 had been expended, were unfortunately destroyed in the fire that consumed the interior of the Medical Hall about 1886.

Scharf also taught at the Virginia Female Institute, which opened on 1 January 1844 in Staunton, Virginia. Known as Professor Scharf, he attended a meeting as Instructor of Elocution in early February 1872.

Scharf returned to the stage from 5 May through 10 May 1884, at the National Theatre in Washington, D.C., where he was cast in Dewdrop, a romantic comedy by Con.T. Murphy and C.E. Callahan, which starred Miss Lizzie Evans. Around 1882–83, he became a member of a travelling dramatic company for four or five seasons, and towards the end of his career he played "leading old men parts" in Miss Lizzie Evans's Company. Almost bald and stoutly built towards the end of his life, his last role was as an old gentleman in Fogg's Ferry.

He arrived in New York penniless early in June 1887. In July, after borrowing $30 to purchase a suit of clothes, he disappeared. Scharf had a bad heart and it was conjectured that he had died at the age of sixty-five.
