= George Johann Scharf =

British artist (1788–1860)

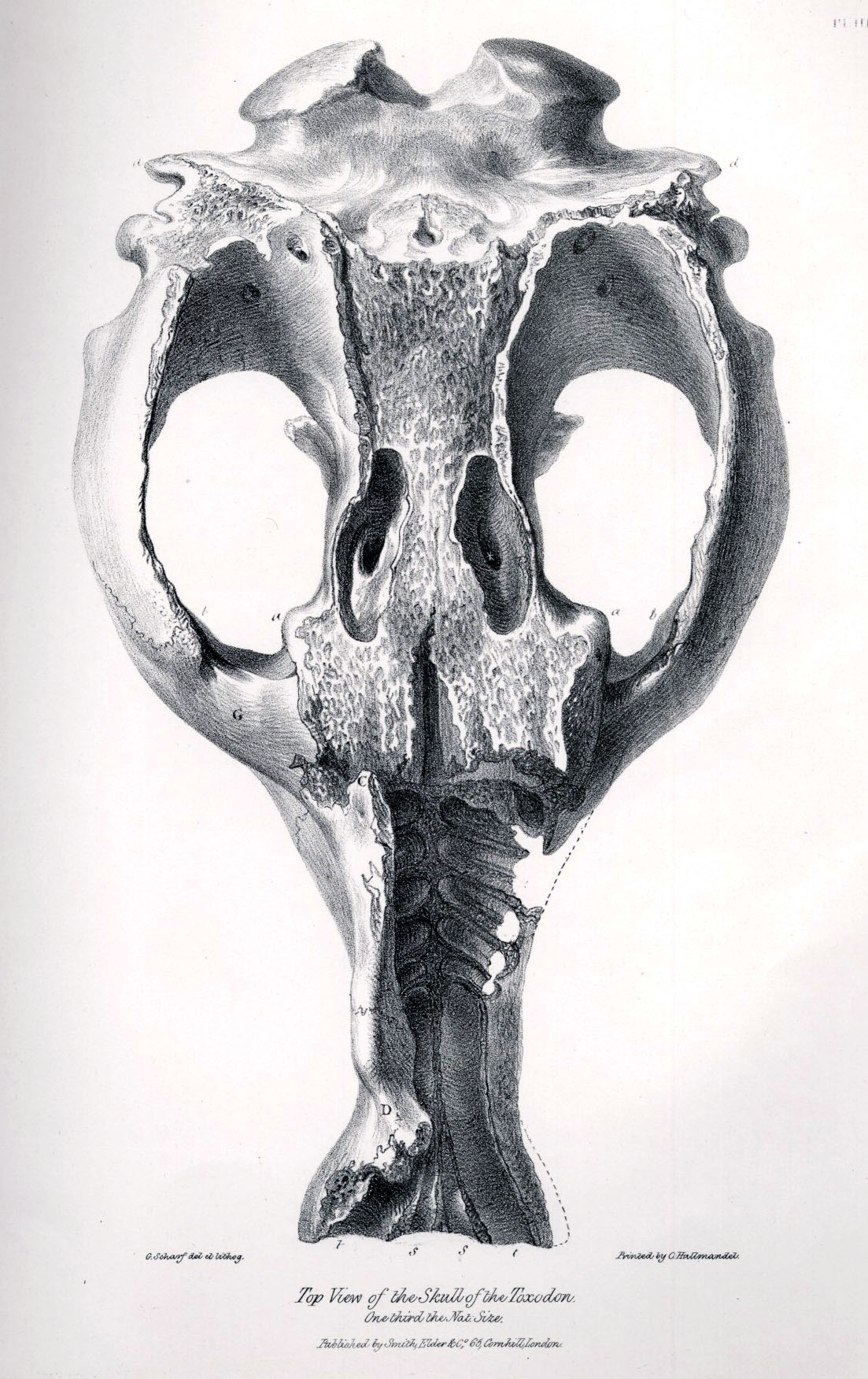
- Drawing of South American fossil skull of toxodon platensis for Charles Darwin, 1838
- Born: 1788; Bavaria
- Died: 1860 (aged 71–72); London
- Occupations: illustrator, water colour painter, draughtsman, and lithographer.

George Johann Scharf (1788–1860) was a water colour painter, draughtsman and lithographer, and father of Sir George Scharf and Henry Scharf. He exhibited his paintings at the Royal Academy from 1817 to 1850, and was a member of the New Society of Painters in Water Colours.

== Early life ==
George Scharf was born in Mainburg, Bavaria in 1788. He was the son of Andreas Scharf and Franziska (née von Peffenhausen). When he was thirteen Scharf left Mainburg and moved to nearby Geisenfeld, where he took drawing lessons with Herr Kiermeyer. In 1805 he left for Munich where he enrolled as a student at the Maler-und Bildhauerakademie, later becoming the Königliche Akademie der Bilden Künste München where he studied the old master pictures in the Pinakothek (Neue Pinakothek). Maximilian Joseph noticed the young artist and purchased his copy of a portrait of Prince Eugène de Beauharnais. After working for a few years as a miniature painter and drawing master, Scharf learned the technique of lithography, which had been recently invented by his fellow countryman Alois Senefelder. Scharf left Germany and wandered for five years in France and the Low Countries. Caught up in the siege of Antwerp in 1814, Scharf escaped and joined the English army, where he was appointed lieutenant of baggage in the engineer department. In this capacity he was present at the Battle of Waterloo and accompanied the allied armies to Paris. While there, he drew some views of the Bois de Boulogne. Advised to try his fortune in England, Scharf left on New Year's Day 1816 and came to London, where he became a successful illustrator of ordinary life in England.

== Professional Life in England ==
After Scharf arrived in London, he married Elizabeth Hicks, his landlady's sister, and lived in a house on St Martin's Lane. At the time, London was a thriving centre for lithography, and Scharf was able to make a respectable living off his topographical views and genre scenes, which were easily transformed into prints. Although George Scharf's life has not been as well-documented as that of his son, he has left to posterity over a thousand drawings, watercolours and lithographs that chronicle London life in the first half of the 19th Century. Most of these works are stored in the British Museum. It was Scharf's ambition to be "taken seriously as a ‘gentleman’ artist rather than as the ‘artisan’ printmaker on which his fame rests today.

During his first years in London, Scharf concentrated on drawing historic events, such as the Westminster Elections of 1818. He then branched out, creating genre images of daily life for German publishers who had settled in London, such as Rudolph Ackermann, and illustrations for a number of London's scientific institutions, such as the Zoological and Geological Societies and the Royal College of Surgeons. Many examples of his skill are contained in the Transactions of the Geological Society and the works of Dr Buckland, Sir Richard Owen, and Professor Sedgwick. He also painted many diagrams of scientific and antiquarian subjects. In 1817, he sent four portraits to the Royal Academy, and from 1826 was a frequent exhibitor, chiefly of topographical views both at the academy and with the New Society of Painters in Water Colours, of which he was elected a member in 1833. In 1830 Scharf made a lithographic print based on Henry De la Beche's Duria Antiquior watercolour, which is credited as being the first scene of prehistoric life from deep time to be widely circulated.

His drawings brought him into contact with Charles Darwin, who commissioned Scharf for a series of illustrations of fossil bones from South America. But the two men had a falling out, for Darwin felt that Scharf's price was too high and that he was (in modern parlance) being ripped off. After this event, Scharf's future commissions with scientific institutions began to dry up, and in his last years, Scharf struggled to sell his work.

== Family ==
Scharf died at 29 Great George Street, Westminster, on 11 November 1860, aged 72. He was buried in the Brompton cemetery. He was survived by his wife Elizabeth Hicks, who lived until 1869, and two sons, George, afterwards Sir George Scharf, and Henry Scharf. After his death, Scharf's wife sold over a thousand of his drawings and watercolours to the British Museum.

== Exhibitions at the Royal Academy ==
This information was taken from The Royal Academy of Arts; a complete dictionary of contributors and their work from its foundation in 1769 to 1904

1817

- Portrait of a Clergyman
- A Benevolent visit to a Poor Sick Woman

1826

- View from Shooter's Hill
- View of Woolwich Dockyard, as seen from the churchyard

1827

- View of the Royal Repository Grounds at Woolwich

1828

- The Savoyards

1829

- Interior of the Royal Military Repository, Woolwich
- The Lord Mayor's Dinner at Guild Hall on 9 November 1830
- Children at their Lessons, "Delightful task to rear the tender thought, etc."
- View of a Lodge at Milton Park

1831

- View of New London Bridge, Taken by order of the Bridge Committee, June 1830

1832

- View of Crooked Lane as it Appeared in 1830, prior to the demolition of St. Michael's Church and adjoining houses for the new line of approach to the new London Bridge

1833

- View of Part of Old Covent Garden Market

1834

- The Old and New London Bridges as they Appeared in December 1831

1835

- Bird's Eye View of St. Stephen's Chapel, taken shortly after the fire from the top of the western wall. Painted on the spot.

1836

- View of the Ruins of St. Stephen's Chapel, taken shortly after the fire

1837

- Deacon's Auction Room, Berner's Street
- Entrance Hall to the Royal Academy, Somerset House, 1836

1841

- The Royal College of Surgeons, in progress of rebuilding in 1834

1848

- View of Ratisbon, Bavaria

1849

- Walhalla and Donau Stauf – On the Danube near Ratisbon (Regensburg), Bavaria

1850

- View of the Town of Kelheim, Bavaria, where the Rhine joins the Danube by means of the river Main, the Ludwig's Canal and the river Atmuhl. On the centre rock was begun the monument (Befreiungs Halle) in commemoration of the Battle of Leipzig, or of Deliverance, fought in 1813.

== Paintings and Illustrations ==
- Base of the Skull of Toxodos Platensis, 1832–36
- The Gallery of New Society of Painters, Victoria & Albert Museum
- Westmacott Lecturing at Somerset House, Royal Academy of Art
- Westminster Elections, Covent Garden
- Images from the 2009 Sir John Soane museum exhibit
- Digital Image Collections at the John Carter Brown Library
