= Mark Scharf =

American dramatist

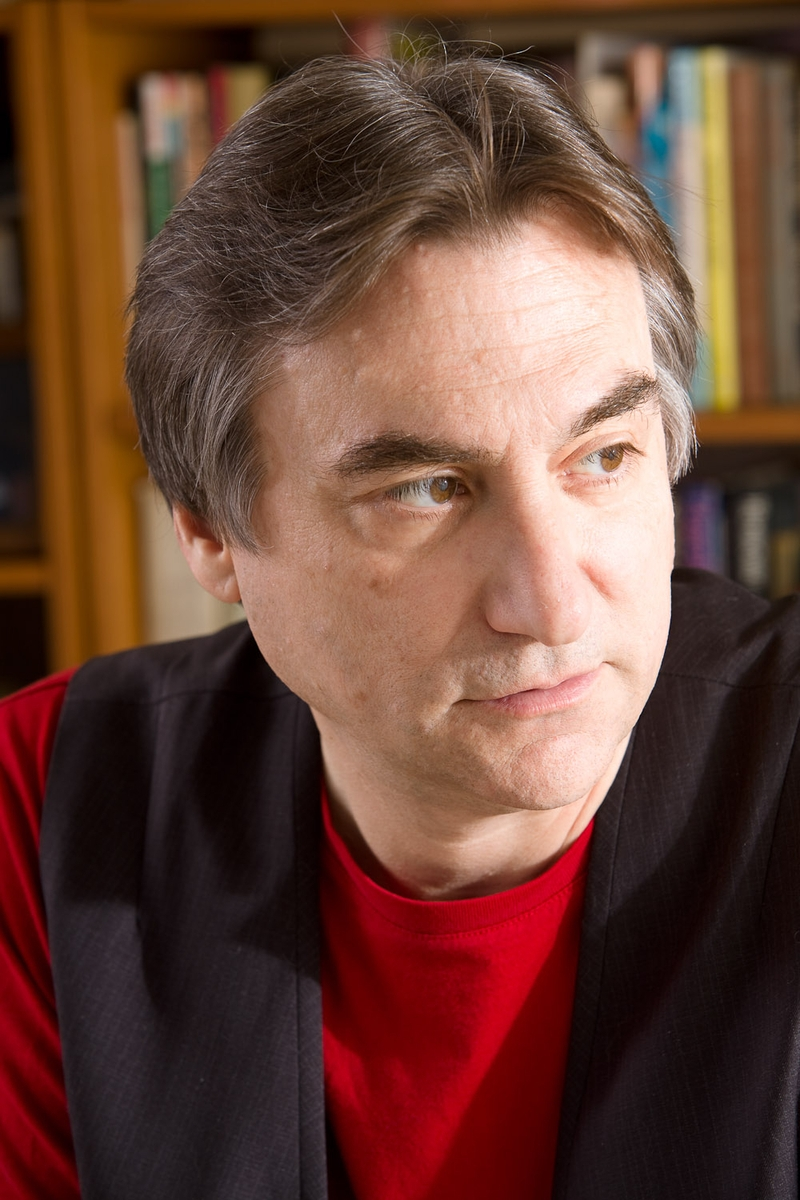
- Mark Scharf in 2009
- Born: September 21, 1956 (age 69); New Albany, Indiana
- Occupation: Playwright
- Writing career
- Period: 1980–present
- Website: www.markscharf.com

Mark Scharf (born September 21, 1956), is an American playwright, actor and teacher. His plays have received readings and productions across the United States and in England, China, Australia, Canada and Singapore.
