= ORP Żbik (1959) =

ORP Żbik was a Polish minesweeper active during the Cold War. It was one of the nine minesweepers built in the Polish People's Republic based on the Soviet-licensed design of the T43-class minesweeper.

ORP Żbik was launched on June 10, 1959 from the Stocznia Gdynia, and was accepted for service in the Navy on November 6 that year. The ship was marked with side marks T-72 and 612 spent most of its service as part of the 12th Base Minesweeper Squadron of the 8th Coastal Defence Flotilla based in Świnoujście. The ship was retired from the fleet list after 30 years in October 1989, and scrapped shortly afterward.
