= James E. Sharp =

American lawyer

James E. Sharp (born in Tulsa, Oklahoma) is an American criminal defense lawyer in Washington, D.C., and a partner in Sharp & Associates, PLLC.

He is an attorney with extensive litigation experience in federal courts throughout the country. He focuses his practice on white collar criminal defense, corporate and federal securities issues, as well as other complex commercial issues. His representations also include professional athletes as well as individuals with personal injury claims. His legal career has spanned representation of individuals charged with major offenses from Watergate to the present time.

As a lieutenant in the Navy JAG Corps following law school, Sharp served as a trial attorney at courts-martial, and also in an investigative capacity respecting the massive Gulf of Tonkin fire aboard the USS Forrestal (CV-59), and later as a counsel to the Supreme Allied Commander respecting the loss of the nuclear submarine USS Scorpion in the North Atlantic.

After his Naval service, Sharp served as an Assistant United States Attorney for the District of Columbia. Sharp successfully prosecution of a United States Senator. For his service as an Assistant United States Attorney, he was awarded the Department of Justice Special Achievement Award.

Since leaving the US Attorney's office, Sharp has represented numerous individuals and corporate interests as well. Among individuals represented was President George W. Bush with respect to a special-counsel matter. Other representations attracting wide exposure have included Jeb Stuart Magruder during the Watergate period; President Richard Nixon's close confidant Charles "Bebe" Rebozo; Oscar Wyatt; Clifford Irving; and on an international level, among others, Philippines General Fabian Ver.

Sharp's representation of professional athletes includes Alex Rodriguez, Andy Pettitte and Sammy Sosa. He has lectured at various bar-related training programs and to attorneys in other laws firms regarding litigation tactics and strategy. He is a Fellow of the American College of Trial Lawyers.

Notwithstanding his many highly visible representations, Sharp chooses to remain out of the public spotlight, consistently declining to discuss the specifics of his representations past or present with the media or otherwise. The New York Times referred to him as "a top lawyer" who has "kept out of the limelight." Similarly, Time magazine described Sharp as the "best unknown lawyer in Washington."
