= James Sharp (footballer, born 1894) =

Scottish footballer

Personal information
- Date of birth: 1894
- Place of birth: Denny, Scotland
- Date of death: 26 April 1915 (aged 20–21)
- Place of death: Flanders, Belgium
- Position(s): Left back

Senior career*
| Years | Team | Apps | (Gls) |
- Grange Rovers
| 1913–1914 | Falkirk | 5 | (0) |
- * Club domestic league appearances and goals

James Sharp (1894 – 26 April 1915) was a Scottish professional footballer who played as a left back in the Scottish League for Falkirk.

== Personal life ==
Soon after the outbreak of the First World War in August 1914, Sharp enlisted as a private in the Argyll and Sutherland Highlanders. He was serving in the 7th Battalion when he was killed in Flanders on 26 April 1915. Sharp is commemorated on the Menin Gate.

== Honours ==
Falkirk

- Stirlingshire Consolation Cup: 1912–13
