= Harry Sharpe (footballer) =

English footballer

Personal information
- Place of birth: Bury, England
- Position: Inside right

Senior career*
Years	Team	Apps	(Gls)
1913–1914	Bury	0	(0)
1914–1915	Glossop	30	(6)
- * Club domestic league appearances and goals

Harry Sharpe was an English professional footballer who played as an inside right in the Football League for Glossop.

== Personal life ==
Sharpe served as a gunner in the Royal Garrison Artillery during the First World War.

== Career statistics ==
Appearances and goals by club, season and competition
Club	Season	League			FA Cup		Total	
Club	Season	Division	Apps	Goals	Apps	Goals	Apps	Goals
Glossop	1914–15	Second Division	30	6	1	0	31	6
Career total			30	6	1	0	31	6
