= Christopher Sharp (barrister) =

British barrister

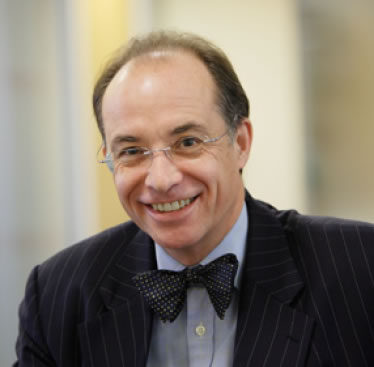
- Christopher Sharp KC
- Born: 17 September 1953 (age 72)
- Occupations: Barrister and Deputy High Court Judge

Christopher Sharp (KC) is a British barrister and Deputy High Court Judge residing in Bristol UK, and notable for his high-profile cases and popularity with some of the biggest insurers in the land. As a prominent figure in his field, Christopher Sharp has been included in Who's Who in recognition of the distinction he has attained in his professional life. He has also been recommended by the Legal 500 and Chambers UK every year since 2009.

Sharp was awarded the top honour of 'star individual' by Chambers UK 2012, which describes him as "one of the top silks in the West" and "exceptionally thorough, hard-working and excellent in terms of his presentation skills". He is also acknowledged by the Legal 500 as "one of the leading family and personal injury silks on the circuit", having "wide experience of the appellate courts, both Court of Appeal and the House of Lords". He acts for the claimant and the defendant with equal frequency.

== Career ==
Educated at Oxford University, Sharp was called to the bar in 1975, and took silk in 1999. He became a Recorder in 2004, and a Deputy High Court Judge in 2011. He holds an honorary MA from Oxford University.

A member and co-founder of St John's Chambers in Bristol UK, Sharp was head of that Chambers for many years, and accepted an invitation to become an associate member of Harcourt Chambers in London. Frances Judd QC (the head of Harcourt Chambers) described the addition of "such a distinguished silk" as "an honour" for the Chambers. A visiting fellow at the University of the West of England, Sharp regularly lectures on subjects related to his areas of practice. He also contributes articles to legal journals in the UK and abroad.

== Memberships ==
- Family Law Bar Association (founder and former chair of the Bristol branch)
- Personal Injury Bar Association
- Professional Negligence Bar Association.

== Personal Injury ==
Rated as 'Band 1' by Chambers UK and commended by the Legal 500 for complex brain and spinal injury cases, Sharp specialises in catastrophic injury and is described as "one of the leading Personal Injury Silks on Circuit".

=== Articles ===
- Personal injury: Not so catastrophic? 160 New Law Journal 373 (12 March 2010)
- 'Does the Animals Act 1971 need amending?' [with Richard Stead] (2006/7) Personal Injury Law Journal
- 'Advocates' Immunity in Common Law Jurisdictions' [with Jody Atkinson] NZLJ – Nov 2006
- Out of Service – NLJ: March 2006
- Pro-active Settlement in Practice – The Personal Injury Law Journal (July 2004)
- Normal Abnormality? Liability for Straying Horses Under the Animals Act 1971: published Sept. 2003 [2003] JPIL Issue 3/03 p172

=== Recent Reported Decisions ===
- 'A' v Hoare [2008] UKHL 6 & [2006] EWCA Civ 395 – sexual assault, limitation and Human Rights
- Poppleton v Peter Ashley Activity Centre [2008] EWCA Civ 646 (tetraplegia, sporting injury)
- Leeson v Marsden [2006] 1 WLR 1945 service and extension of time (clinical negligence)
- B v B [2005] EWCA 237: lifting stay in sexual abuse claim
- Stimpson v Excel Logistics [2004] EWCA Civ 1249: causation in product liability
- Nineham v Glynwed International Ltd [2004] QBD (Brain damage: bottom up structured settlement)
- Mirvahedy v Henley [2003] 2 AC 491
- [2002] CA (Animals Act 1971). Professional negligence

== Family/Matrimonial ==
Head of the family practice group at St John's Chambers, Sharp "is widely known for his expertise in high-value ancillary relief cases in which he is equally at home negotiating multimillion-pound settlements or fighting them in court".

=== Articles ===
- Pre-nuptial Agreements: a Rethink Required [2008] Fam Law (August)
- 'Advocates' Immunity in Common Law Jurisdictions': New Zealand Law Journal November 2006
- The Use of Section 24A Matrimonial Causes Act 1973 and its role in personal insolvency: published Fam Law [2005] 132 (February)
- Bigamy and Financial Relief: published [2003] Family Law 414
- The Manchester Conjoined Twins Case: A case note on the Court of Appeal decision in Re A addressing both Family Law aspects and consent to operative intervention. Published 6 October 2000, NLJ Vol 150 p. 1460
- Putting Children First: New Zealand Law Journal (Dec 1998)

=== Recent Reported Decisions ===
- RP v RP [2007] Fam Law 461 (Application of Miller/McFarlane)
- Van Laethem v Brooker [2006] 2 FLR 495 (TLATA)
- Ram v Ram [2005] 2 FLR 75 (bankruptcy). Public law Children Act – particularly cases involving complex medical issues in fact finding hearings.
- Bath & North East Somerset Council v A Mother & Ors. [2009] EWHC B10 (Fam), publication of judgment in family proceedings
- H (A Child) [2009] EWCA Civ 334, sexual abuse, appropriate approach to judicial analysis of evidence. Private Law (children)
- Re A (Suspended Residence Order) [2010] 1 FLR 1679 (Fam Div), intractable opposition to contact, residence order suspended pending compliance;
- Re D (Children) [2009] CA (Civ Div) child sexual abuse, contact orders, expert reports;

== Personal life ==
The only son of Charles and Lillian, Sharp married Sarah Cripps in 1978. He has one daughter, Melanie, and a son, Charles, both doctors, and both married. Sharp enjoys real tennis, skiing, sailing and theatre.
