= Phil Sharpe (footballer) =

English footballer and manager

Personal information
- Full name: Philip Sharpe
- Date of birth: 26 January 1968 (age 58)
- Place of birth: Leeds, England
- Position: Striker

Youth career
- 1984–1986: Doncaster Rovers

Senior career*
Years	Team	Apps	(Gls)
1986–1989	Halifax Town	1	(0)
1987–1988	→ Altrincham (loan)		
- → Goole Town (loan)
1989–19??	Eendracht Wervik		
19??–1992	URS du Centre		
1992–1993	Farsley Celtic		
1993	→ Altrincham (loan)		
1993–1994	Gateshead		
1994–1996	Farsley Celtic		
1996–2000	Bradford (Park Avenue)		
1998–1999	→ Harrogate Town (loan)		
2000	Garforth Town		

Managerial career
- 2000–2002: Guiseley (assistant)
- 2002–2004: Frickley Athletic
- 2004–2006: Wakefield & Emley (assistant)
- 2006–2007: Bradford (Park Avenue)
- 2007: Northwich Victoria (assistant)
- 2008–2010: Harrogate Railway
- 2010–2012: Ossett Town
- 2012–2015: Aberford Albion
- 2018: Goole AFC
- * Club domestic league appearances and goals

Philip Sharpe (born 26 January 1968) is a former professional footballer, and was also manager of Bradford P.A. amongst others.

As a player, he started at Doncaster Rovers under Billy Bremner before playing at Halifax Town, Farsley Celtic and abroad at Eendracht Wervik and Union de Centre in Belgium. Sharpe played in the Football League for Halifax.

He returned to play for Gateshead, Ashton Utd, Bradford P.A., Garforth Town and Guiseley. He was appointed Frickley Athletic player-manager in July 2002. With Frickley he won the Sheffield & Hallamshire Senior Cup in season 2003-04.

Sharpe joined A.F.C. Emley as assistant to Paul David in September 2004, after leaving as manager of Frickley Athletic earlier that month. He joined Bradford Park Avenue late in the 2005-06 season when manager Gary Brook was sacked, but was himself replaced by Benny Philips in March 2007. He joined Northwich Victoria in October 2007 as assistant to Neil Redfearn. He left to join Harrogate Railway Athletic as Manager in October 2008.
