= Henry Sharpe =

Henry Sharpe may refer to:

- Henry Granville Sharpe (1858–1947), US Army officer
- Henry Sharpe (priest) (fl. 1620s), Anglican priest in Ireland
- Henry A. Sharpe (1848–1919), Justice of the Alabama Supreme Court
