= ORP Admirał Sierpinek =

Polish and Soviet river military vessel

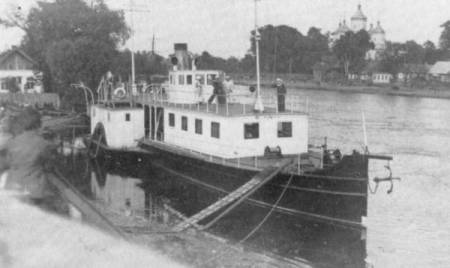
Admirał Sierpinek, 1930

ORP Admirał Sierpinek was a Polish command vessel, armed paddle steamer, former Russian cargo steamer Tatiana.

The name commemorated Mateusz Sierpinek, the first Polish admiral (16th century).

After the Russian Revolution Tatiana was owned by the Bolsheviks, but during the Polish-Soviet War, in 1920 it was abandoned by the Red Army, captured by the Polish forces, repaired, and incorporated into the Pinsk Flotilla under the name T 2. The same year T 2 was sunk by the crew, blown up by explosives, together with a number of other vessels, due to the impossibility of navigation, raised by the Soviets and sunk again. In 1921 the Poles raised it again and renamed Admirał Sierpinek.

After the Soviet Invasion of Poland in 1939, the ship was sunk by the crew. In 1939 it was salvaged by the Red Army and put into service under the name Pripyat, but in June 1941 it was scuttled again by the Soviets at Kiev, raised in 1944 and scrapped.
