= Sharp =

Sharp or SHARP may refer to:

== Acronyms ==
- SHARP (helmet ratings) (Safety Helmet Assessment and Rating Programme), a British motorcycle helmet safety rating scheme
- Self Help Addiction Recovery Program, a charitable organisation founded in 1991 by Barbara Bach and Pattie Boyd
- Sexual Harassment/Assault Response & Prevention, a US Army program dealing with sexual harassment
- Skinheads Against Racial Prejudice, an anti-racist Trojan skinhead organization formed to combat White power skinheads
- Society for the History of Authorship, Reading and Publishing
- Stationary High Altitude Relay Platform, a 1980s beamed-power aircraft
- Super High Altitude Research Project, a 1990s project to develop a high-velocity gun
- SIGINT High Altitude Replenishment Program (SHARP)

== Companies ==
- I. P. Sharp Associates, a former Canadian computer services company
- Sharp Airlines, an Australian regional airline
- Sharp Corporation, a Japanese electronics manufacturer
  - Sharp Solar, a manufacturer of photovoltaic cells and filma
- Sharp Entertainment, an American TV program producer
- Sharp HealthCare, a hospital system in San Diego, California
  - Sharp Memorial Hospital, San Diego
  - Sharp Chula Vista Medical Center, Chula Vista, California

== Music ==
- Sharp (music), a musical notation sign (♯)
- Sharp (English band), English band featuring ex-Jam members
- Sharp (South Korean band), pop music group
- The Sharp, Australian pop/rock band
- Sharp (Angela Winbush album)
- Sharp (Etnica album), 2004

== People and fictional characters ==
- Sharp (surname), a list of people and fictional characters
- Sharp Delany (c. 1739–1799), American Revolutionary War colonel and member of the legislature of Pennsylvania
- Sharp Räsänen (born 1999), Finnish footballer
- Sharp, e.g. card sharp, a swindler at games of chance and skill

== Places and geographical features ==
=== Antarctica ===
- Sharp Glacier, Graham Land
- Sharp Peak, Livingston Island, South Shetland Islands, a hill
- Sharp Valley, on James Ross Island, Antarctic Peninsula
- Mount Sharp (Antarctica), Sentinel Range, West Antarctica

=== United States ===
- Sharp, Missouri, an unincorporated community
- Sharp County, Arkansas
- Sharp Burial Ground, Kingston, New York
- Sharp Mountain, Pennsylvania, a ridgeline

=== Outer space ===
- Sharp (crater), a crater on the Moon
- Mount Sharp, a small mountain on Mars
- 5426 Sharp, an asteroid

=== Other places ===
- Sharp Glacier (Greenland)
- Sharp Island, Hong Kong
- Sharp Island (Ontario), Georgian Bay, Canada
- Sharp Peak, a hill in Hong Kong

== Publications ==
- Sharp (magazine), a Canadian magazine
- Sharp Daily, a free newspaper published in Taiwan and Hong Kong

== Titles ==
- Eric Sharp, Baron Sharp of Grimsdyke (1916–1994)
- Evelyn Sharp, Baroness Sharp (1903–1985), British civil servant
- Margaret Sharp, Baroness Sharp of Guildford (born 1938)
- Sharp baronets, three titles, one in the Baronetage of Nova Scotia and two in the Baronetage of the United Kingdom

== Other uses ==
- Sharp (automobile)
- Sharp (flour), a flour made from hard wheat
- Sharp sand
- Sharp (science), also called a hypodermic needle
- Sharp series, a series of spectral lines
- Sharp (set theory)
- Sharp (TV series)
- Sharp Gymnasium, a multi-purpose arena in Houston, Texas, United States, home to the Houston Baptist University Huskies basketball and volleyball teams
- Sharp Scale, a measure of paper opacity
- Sharp, a type of sewing needle
- Sharp, a mathematics term often applied to upper and lower bounds; see Mathematical jargon

== See also ==
- Helgi the Sharp (Ringerike), a figure in Norse mythology
- Helgi the Sharp (Zealand), a figure in Norse mythology
- Sharp House (disambiguation)
- Sharp Resolution, a 1617 resolution taken by the States of Holland and West Friesland
- Sharp v. Murphy, a US Supreme Court case decided in 2020
- Sharpe (disambiguation)
- Sharpness (disambiguation)
- Sharps (disambiguation)
