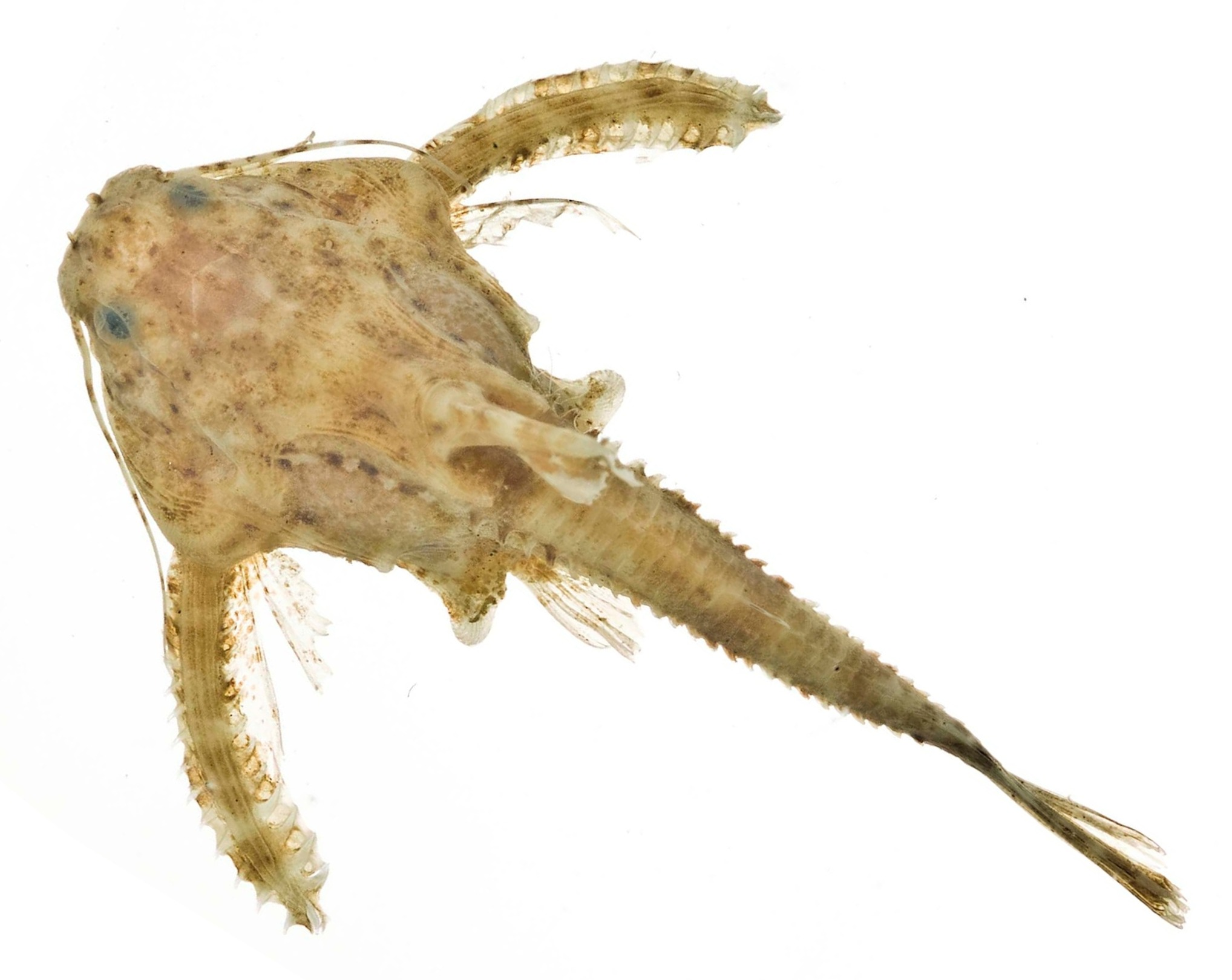

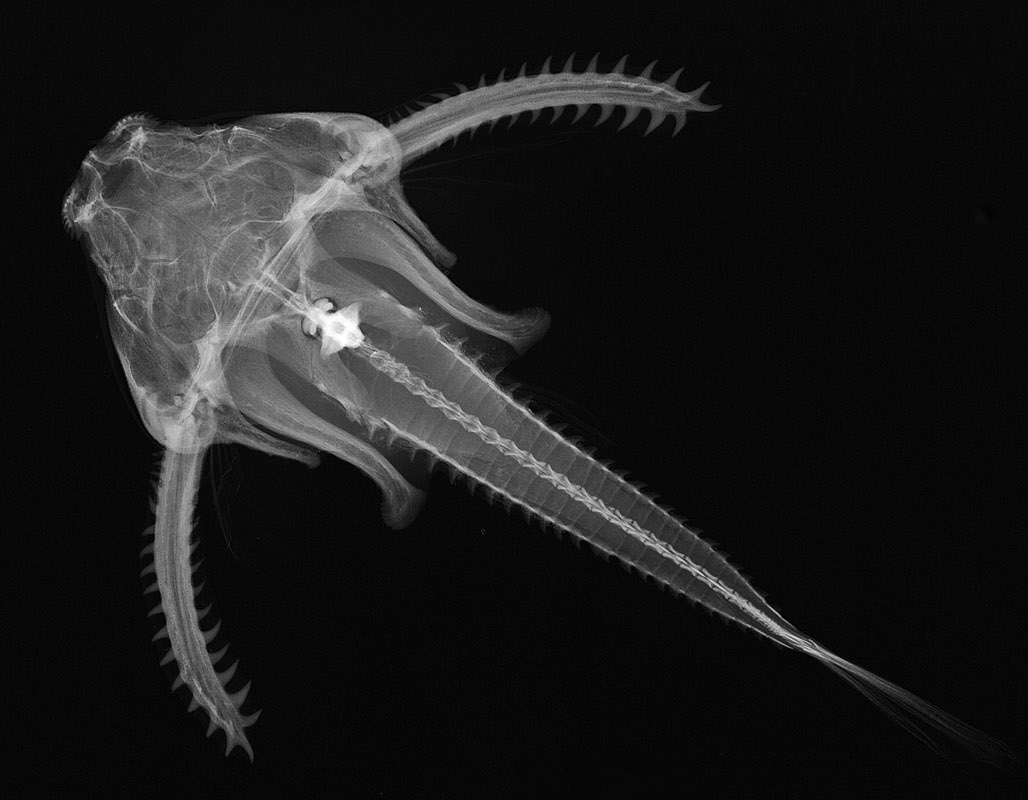
- Physopyxis lyra, conventional and X-ray images

Scientific classification
- Kingdom: Animalia
- Phylum: Chordata
- Class: Actinopterygii
- Order: Siluriformes
- Family: Doradidae
- Subfamily: Astrodoradinae
- Genus: Physopyxis; Cope, 1871

Type species
- Physopyxis lyra Cope, 1872

= Physopyxis =

Genus of fishes

Physopyxis is a genus of thorny catfishes native to tropical South America.

== Species ==
There are currently three recognized species in this genus.

- Physopyxis ananas Sousa & Rapp Py-Daniel, 2005
- Physopyxis cristata Sousa & Rapp Py-Daniel, 2005
- Physopyxis lyra Cope, 1872

== Distribution ==
P. lyra is known from the Ampyiacu River (and lowland portions of other tributaries to the upper Amazon River in northeastern Peru) to the Uatumã River, a left bank tributary to the Amazon in eastern Amazonas State, Brazil. P. ananas has the widest distribution among the species of the genus, occurring throughout lowlands in entire Amazon (including Rio Negro) and Essequibo River basins. P. cristata has only been recorded from middle portion of the Negro River basin.

== Description ==
Physopyxis have an extremely small size among doradids, not exceeding 3.5 centimetres (1.4 in) SL. Their pectoral fin spine reaches the base of the anal fin, and the dorsal fin spine is serrated only at the anterior margin of its base. There are three pairs of barbels, one pair of maxillary barbels and two pairs of mental barbels. The dorsal and pectoral fin spines are strongly ossified and well-developed.

P. cristata can be differentiated from the other species by its incomplete lateral line and a series of small spines along its dorsal midline. The other two species have complete lateral lines with well-developed plates that extend to the caudal fin. P. lyra has only one series of spines on its lateral plates and its adipose fin is usually present. The lateral plates have two or more series of spines in P. ananas, and the adipose fin is usually absent.

== Habitat ==
Physopyxis species are usually found in places with accumulated organic debris, like dense meshes of roots of floating macrophytes that are abundant in rivers with turbid water or submerged litter banks. Specimens also can be found among submerged leaf litter and among root mats of riparian plants, like Symmeria paniculata (Polygonaceae). P. lyra is predominantly nocturnal, and spends most of day time sheltered among submersed root mats or buried in sand. P. ananas and P. lyra have been found together among the submerged roots of aquatic macrophytes (Paspallum repens, Poaceae) at Amanã Lake, Japurá River basin. They were also collected together in Nanay upstream from Iquitos. Dwarf cichlids of the genus Apistogramma and juvenile specimens of Amblydoras were found in the same habitat as P. cristata.
