= Sharps =

Sharps may refer to:

- Plural form of many of the terms as defined on Sharp (disambiguation)
- Sharps waste, a form of biomedical waste composed of used sharps
- Sharps Bedrooms
- Sharp's Brewery, Rock, Cornwall, UK (cask conditioned beer brewery)
- Sharps rifle
- Sharps Rifle Manufacturing Company, a firearms company

== Streams ==
- Sharps Creek (Kansas), in McPherson County
- Sharps Creek (Oregon), in Lane County
- Sharps Run (New Jersey), a stream in New Jersey
- Sharps Run (Cow Creek), a stream in West Virginia

== People with the surname Sharps ==
- Christian Sharps (1810–1874), American firearms designer
- Ian Sharps (born 1980), English footballer

== Other ==
- Supporters for the Health And Rights of People in the Semiconductor Industry, SHARPS

== See also ==
- Sharpe (disambiguation)
- Sharpie (disambiguation)
