= Justice Sharp =

Justice Sharp may refer to:

- John H. Sharp (1874–1957), justice of the Texas Supreme Court
- Susie Sharp (1907–1996), chief justice of the North Carolina Supreme Court
- Victoria Sharp (born 1956), justice of the Court of Appeal of England and Wales

== See also ==
- Judge Sharp (disambiguation)
- Justice Sharpe (disambiguation)
