= Sharpe =

Sharpe may refer to:

- Sharpe (surname), people with the surname Sharpe
- Sharpe, Kansas, a community in the United States
- Sharpe, Kentucky, a community in the United States
- Sharpe James, American politician, New Jersey
- Sharpe (novel series), series of historical novels written by Bernard Cornwell
  - Richard Sharpe (fictional character), the title character of the Sharpe series by Bernard Cornwell
  - Sharpe (TV series), the television series based on Cornwell's books
- Sharpe ratio, financial statistic describing portfolio returns
- Lake Sharpe, created by the construction of Big Bend Dam in South Dakota
- Sharpe Field, a private airport in Alabama, United States
- R. v. Sharpe, Canadian legal proceedings

== See also ==
- Sharp (disambiguation)
- Sharpie (disambiguation)
- Sharps (disambiguation)
- Justice Sharpe (disambiguation)
