= Sharpness =

Sharpness may refer to:

- Sharpness, Gloucestershire, a port in England
- Sharpness (cutting), the capacity of a surface to initiate a cut on another surface
- Sharpness (visual), a combination of resolution and acutance
  - Critical focus or critical sharpness, the area of maximal optical resolution
- Sharpness of vision, or visual acuity
- A bitterness of flavour, for example, in sharp cheddar cheese
- Intelligence, perceptiveness, or "street smarts"
- Acutance, sharpness of an image

== See also ==
- Sharp (disambiguation)
- Sharpening, the creation of sharpness of a cutting tool or similar
