= Amblydoras nheco =

Conservation status
- Least Concern (IUCN 3.1)

Scientific classification
- Kingdom: Animalia
- Phylum: Chordata
- Class: Actinopterygii
- Order: Siluriformes
- Family: Doradidae
- Genus: Amblydoras
- Species: A. nheco

Binomial name
- Amblydoras nheco (Higuchi, Birindelli, Sousa & Britski, 2007)

Synonyms
- Merodoras nheco

Species of fish

Amblydoras nheco is a species of freshwater ray-finned fish, which was described as the only species in the genus Merodoras of the catfish (order Siluriformes) family Doradidae.

== Taxonomy ==
Amblydoras nheco was described in 2007. It belongs to the subfamily Astrodoradinae.

== Distribution and habitat ==
Amblydoras nheco inhabits a flooded portion of the upper Paraguay River basin in western Brazil called the Pantanal Matogrossense. Here it lives in the lentic lakes in flooded areas.

== Appearance and anatomy ==
Amblydoras nheco is like other doradids. It has three pairs of barbels (one pair maxillary, two pairs mental), strong dorsal and pectoral fin spines. A. nheco is differentiated from all other doradids by having its scutes with thorns directed ventrally in adults, and from all doradids except Physopyxis cristata by having an incomplete lateral line. It has a smooth dorsal fin spine, as opposed to a serrated one; the only other genus with smooth dorsal fin spines is Anadoras. Also, it has a truncated caudal fin. This species grows to a length of 7.0 centimetres (2.8 in) SL.

== Ecology ==
Amblydoras nheco is fed upon by spectacled caimans (Caiman crocodilus yacare) when its habitat dries over the winter. The seasonal drop in water level makes these fish easier for the caiman to catch. These fish are often hosts to tongue worms, which inhabit their swim bladders.
