= Sharpie =

Sharpie, Sharpy or Sharpey may refer to:

== Boats ==
- Sharpie (boat), a type of long, narrow sailboat
- 12 m^{2} Sharpie, a small, vintage, former Olympic sailboat

== People ==
- Sharpie, a member of Skinheads Against Racial Prejudice
- Sharpies (Australian subculture), members of certain Australian youth gangs in the 1960s and 1970s
- William Sharpey (1802–1880), Scottish anatomist and physiologist called the "father of British physiology"
- Thomas J. Sharpy, United States Air Force lieutenant general, commander of the Eighteenth Air Force in 2015
- Sharpy or Sharpie, nickname of Patrick Sharp (born 1981), Canadian retired ice hockey player
- Sharpy, nickname of Will Sharp (born 1986), Nigerian rugby league footballer

== Other uses ==
- Sharpie (marker), a brand of markers, particularly permanent markers
- Sharp-shinned hawk, a bird sometimes referred to as a "sharpie"
- Sharpy, a character in The Bluffers, a Dutch children's cartoon series
- Sharpie, a nickname for steam locomotives manufactured by Sharp Brothers - see History of rail transport#Further developments

== See also ==
- The Sharpees, an American R&B group
- Shar Pei, a breed of dog
- Sharp (disambiguation)
- Sharpe (disambiguation)
- Sharps (disambiguation)
- Charpy (disambiguation)
- #P, potentially pronounced as "Sharp P"
