= Sharps Run =

Sharps Run may refer to:

- Sharps Run (New Jersey), a stream in New Jersey
- Sharps Run (Cow Creek), a stream in West Virginia
