= Judge Sharp =

Judge Sharp or Sharpe may refer to:

- Allen Sharp (1932–2009), judge of the United States District Court for the Northern District of Indiana
- G. Kendall Sharp (1934–2022), judge of the United States District Court for the Middle District of Florida
- Kevin H. Sharp (born 1963), judge of the United States District Court for the Middle District of Tennessee
- Morell Edward Sharp (1920–1980), judge of the United States District Court for the Western District of Washington
- Gary L. Sharpe (1947–2024), judge of the United States District Court for the Northern District of New York
- George H. Sharpe (1828–1900), member of the Board of General Appraisers, predecessor of the United States Court of International Trade

== See also ==
- Justice Sharp (disambiguation)
