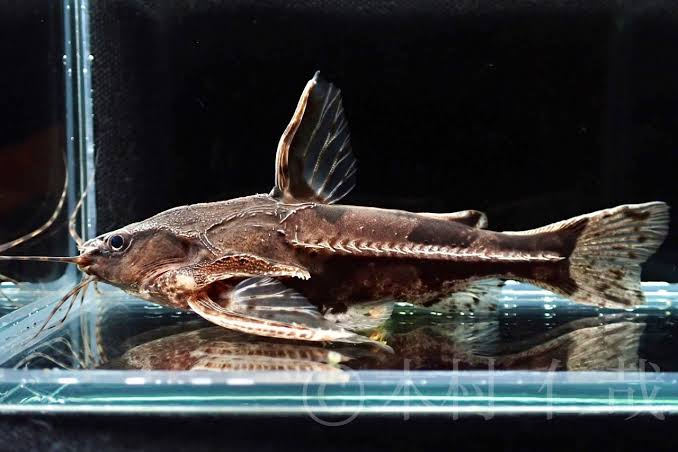

Conservation status
- Least Concern (IUCN 3.1)

Scientific classification
- Domain: Eukaryota
- Kingdom: Animalia
- Phylum: Chordata
- Class: Actinopterygii
- Order: Siluriformes
- Family: Doradidae
- Genus: Amblydoras
- Species: A. monitor

Binomial name
- Amblydoras monitor (Cope, 1872)

Synonyms
- Zathorax monitor Cope, 1872

= Amblydoras monitor =

Species of fish

Amblydoras monitor is a species of thorny catfish that occurs in the upper Amazon Basin where it can be found in the countries of Brazil, Colombia and Peru. This species grows to a length of 9.0 centimetres (3.5 in) SL.
