= John S. McDonald =

American judge (1864–1941)

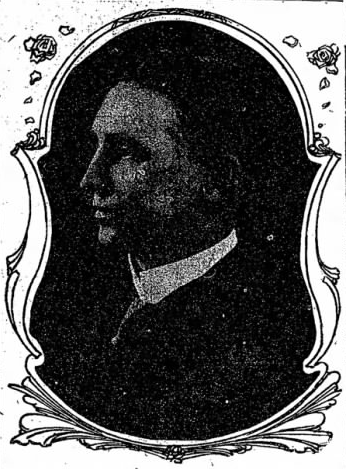
John S. McDonald (circa 1913)

John S. McDonald (February 8, 1864 – July 6, 1941) was a justice of the Michigan Supreme Court from 1922 to 1933, serving as chief justice in 1925 and 1933.

== Life and education ==
Born February 8, 1864, in Dundas County, Canada West, then moving to a farm near Thamesville, Canada West when he was around two year of age. He had his basic schooling at Ridgetown, Ontario, and went to Victoria University in Coburg in 1887. Spending some time teaching in Florence, Ontario, he then moved to Grand Rapids, Michigan, to continue teaching at the Seymour School. After earning enough teaching he entered the University of Michigan Law School, but after one year of study returned to Grand Rapids and continued his law studies with the law firm of Eggleston & McBride and was admitted to the bar.

== Legal career ==
He worked in private practice until he was elected as the Kent County prosecuting attorney in 1906 and served until he was appointed as a circuit judge for the same county in March 1908 to fill the seat left by the death of Judge Alfred Wolcott. In 1921 the former mayor of Bay City Robert Mundy filed a libel lawsuit against him, but it was dismissed as inadmissible as a judge could not be made the object of a suit of law.

After fourteen years as a circuit judge he was appointed in 1922 to the supreme court by governor Alex J. Groesbeck to fill the vacant position on the court left by the death of John W. Stone. The appointment would stand until November when an election for the remainder of Justice Stones term be run, and he was duly elected to continue in the position.

June 6, 1924, was awarded an honorary degree of Bachelor of Laws for the University of Michigan postdated as the class of 1891.

He was the chief justice of the court in both 1925 and then again in 1933. He was defeated in a bid for re-election to the court in 1933, by Edward M. Sharpe, and ended his term on the bench December 31, 1933. After retiring from the court he returned to private practice with his son John Duncan McDonald in Grand Rapids in a firm called McDonald & McDonald.

In both 1936 and again in 1937 he was the chairman of the state liquor control commission. He was later appointed in 1939 as chief counsel for the State of Michigan in litigation with the Grand Trunk Railroad. In the tax cases against the Grand Trunk Railroad he won and acquired for the state back tax in excess of one million dollars.

== Death ==
He died July 6, 1941, at his home due to cardiac issues after a year long illness. He was survived by his wife Adelaide Duncan McDonald and John Duncan McDonald his son.

Political offices
Preceded by John W. Stone	Justice of the Michigan Supreme Court; 1922–1933	Succeeded by Edward M. Sharpe
