= Cutting =

Partial or complete separation of a body or system into two or more parts

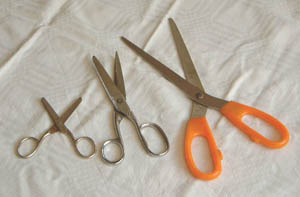
Different types of scissors – sewing (left), paper (middle), kitchen (right)

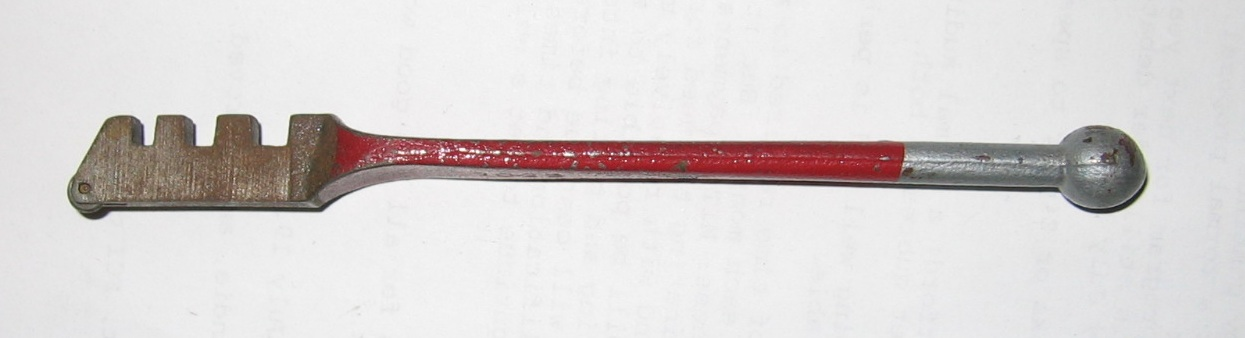
A glass cutter, showing hardened steel cutting wheel (far left), notches for snapping, and ball (on end of handle) for tapping

Cutting is the separation or opening of a physical object through the application of an acutely directed force.

Implements commonly used for cutting are the knife and saw, or in medicine and science the scalpel and microtome. However, any sufficiently sharp object is capable of cutting if it has a hardness sufficiently greater than the object being cut, and if it is applied with sufficient force. Even liquids can be used to cut things when applied with sufficient force (see water jet cutter).

Cutting is a compressive and shearing phenomenon, and occurs only when the total stress generated by the cutting implement exceeds the ultimate strength of the material of the object being cut. The simplest applicable equation is:

$\text{stress} = {\text{force} \over \text{area}}$ or $\tau=\frac{F}{A}$

The stress generated by a cutting implement is directly proportional to the force with which it is applied, and inversely proportional to the area of contact. Hence, the smaller the area (i.e., the sharper the cutting implement), the less force is needed to cut something. It is generally seen that cutting edges are thinner for cutting soft materials and thicker for harder materials. This progression is seen from kitchen knife, to cleaver, to axe, and is a balance between the easy cutting action of a thin blade vs strength and edge durability of a thicker blade.

== Metal cutting ==
Cutting has been at the core of manufacturing throughout history. For metals many methods are used and can be grouped by the physical phenomenon used. It is the process of producing a work piece by removing unwanted material from a block of metal, in the form of chips.

- Chip forming (material removal processes) – sawing, drilling, milling, turning etc.
- Shearing – punching, stamping, scissoring, blanking
- Abrasive material removal – grinding, lapping, polishing, water-jet
- Heat – flame cutting, plasma cutting, laser cutting
- Electrochemical – etching, electrical discharge machining (EDM), electrochemical machining (ECM)

Every method has its limitations in accuracy, cost, and effect on the material. For example, heat may damage the quality of heat treated alloys, and laser cutting is less suitable for highly reflective materials such as aluminum. Laser cutting sheet metal produces flat parts and etches and engraves parts from complex or simple designs. It is used over other cutting options for its quick process and customizable abilities.

== See also ==
- Tearing
- Machining
- Knife sharpening
- Laser cutting
- Sharpness (cutting)
- Water jet cutting
