= Amblydoras affinis =

Scientific classification
- Domain: Eukaryota
- Kingdom: Animalia
- Phylum: Chordata
- Class: Actinopterygii
- Order: Siluriformes
- Family: Doradidae
- Genus: Amblydoras
- Species: A. affinis

Binomial name
- Amblydoras affinis (Kner, 1855)

Synonyms
- Doras affinis Kner, 1855

Species of fish

Amblydoras affinis is a species of thorny catfish found in Bolivia, Brazil and Guyana. It is found in the basins of the Guaporé, Branco and Essequibo Rivers. This species grows to a length of 10.0 centimetres (3.9 in) SL.
