= Richard Sharp (banker) =

British banker

Chairman of the BBC
- In office 10 February 2021 – 27 June 2023
- Preceded by: David Clementi
- Succeeded by: Elan Closs Stephens (acting); Samir Shah

Personal details
- Born: Richard Simon Sharp; 8 February 1956 (age 70) London, England
- Spouse: Victoria Hull (divorced)
- Children: 4
- Parents: Eric Sharp; Marion Freedman
- Relatives: Victoria Sharp (twin sister)
- Education: Merchant Taylors' School, Northwood
- Alma mater: Christ Church, Oxford
- Occupation: Banker, Chair of the BBC

Richard Simon Sharp (born 8 February 1956) is a British former banker who became chairman of the BBC in February 2021. Following the findings of the Heppinstall inquiry into the appointment process, Sharp submitted his resignation to the BBC Board and to the Culture Secretary, which took effect at the end of June 2023.

Sharp worked for JP Morgan and Goldman Sachs, and served as chairman of the Royal Academy of Arts (2007–2012) and as a member of the Bank of England's Financial Policy Committee (2013–2019). While at Goldman Sachs, Sharp managed future Prime Minister Rishi Sunak. Commentators had observed that his relationship with Sunak would probably help him to lead negotiations with the government over the future of the BBC's licence fee.

Sharp has donated more than £400,000 to the Conservative Party. He helped to secure an £800,000 loan to Boris Johnson during his tenure as prime minister and this led to the inquiry and his resignation.

== Early life ==
Richard Simon Sharp was born on 8 February 1956, to a Jewish family in London. He is the son of Eric Sharp, Baron Sharp of Grimsdyke, who was chairman of Cable & Wireless plc from 1980 to 1990. His twin sister, Dame Victoria Sharp, is president of the King's Bench Division of the High Court in England and Wales.

He was educated at Merchant Taylors' School, Northwood and then at Christ Church, Oxford where, in 1978, he was awarded a degree in Philosophy, Politics and Economics.

== Career ==
Sharp worked for JP Morgan for eight years. He then worked for Goldman Sachs for 23 years, rising to chairman of its principal investment business in Europe, before leaving in 2007. He was Rishi Sunak's boss at Goldman Sachs.

He was an advisor to Boris Johnson when he was Mayor of London, and acted as an unpaid adviser to Sunak on the UK's economic response to the COVID-19 pandemic. He was a member of the Bank of England's Financial Policy Committee from 2013 to 2019. In 2014, he joined the property investment company RoundShield Partners, where he was a senior member until February 2021, when The Guardian approached the firm for comment. RoundShield advised and managed a fund that provided a £50m loan to Caridon Property, which has been accused of "cramming homeless and low-income families into former office blocks".

Sharp was chairman of the Royal Academy of Arts from 2007 to 2012.

== BBC chairmanship ==
In January 2021 it was announced that he would be the next chairman of the BBC, succeeding David Clementi who was due to leave the position the following month. Speaking shortly after his appointment, Sharp told the Digital, Culture, Media and Sport Committee that he planned to give his £160,000 BBC salary to charity.

=== Conservative donations ===
In January 2023, The Guardian reported that Sharp had donated more than £400,000 to the Conservative Party and that he was a former director of the Centre for Policy Studies, a think tank created by Margaret Thatcher in the 1970s with historical links to the Conservative Party. The appointment followed that of Tim Davie, a former Conservative Party council candidate, to the role of Director-General. Diane Coyle, formerly of the BBC Trust, stated in January 2023 that Sharp should never have even been on the selection panel.

In January 2023, The Sunday Times reported that just weeks before Sharp was announced as BBC chairman, he helped the then prime minister, Boris Johnson, secure an £800,000 loan. Sharp helped connect Johnson with Sam Blyth, a multimillionaire Canadian businessman and one of Johnson's distant cousins, who acted as a guarantor. Sharp did not disclose any involvement with Johnson's financial arrangements during the interview process, nor at a hearing before a select committee. He acknowledged that he "connected" Johnson and Blyth but denied that this was a conflict of interest. Replying to a question about this from Sky News, Johnson said that Sharp knew nothing about his personal finances.

Following the story, the Labour Party called for an investigation into Sharp's appointment as chair of the BBC and suggested that the prime minister had breached the code of conduct. The accusations have been dismissed by the Cabinet Office via a spokesperson and members of the government have maintained that Sharp was hired on merit. The Board of the BBC was reviewing potential conflicts of interest, but Sharp has stated that he would not quit his position.

Writing in The Guardian on 24 January 2023, Roger Bolton drew parallels with the controversy over the appointment by the Tony Blair Labour government, of Gavyn Davies as chairman of the BBC in 2001. Bolton described him as having been both a member of, and donor to, the Labour Party, and "also a multimillionaire", and as "a former partner at Goldman Sachs", and his wife was a "private secretary to the prime minister". Bolton also described how the director general under Davies, Greg Dyke, had also been a Labour Party member and donor. Roger Mosey stated restoring trust in BBC impartiality should involve ending political appointments to the chairmanship. Mosey maintained "All governments have done it."

Sharp's failure to tell the Digital, Culture, Media and Sport Committee of his discussions was examined at their meeting on 7 February 2023. The committee concluded that this omission prevented appropriate scrutiny. The cross-party committee stated Sharp failed to provide "the full facts we required to make an informed judgment on his suitability as a candidate. Mr Sharp should consider the impact his omissions will have on trust in him, the BBC and the public appointments process". Labour MP Lucy Powell feared the report put the impartiality and independence of the BBC into doubt and criticised "cronyism", while Liberal Democrat MP Daisy Cooper called for the ministerial ethics adviser to investigate Johnson.

The broadcaster Jonathan Dimbleby called for Sharp's resignation. Journalist Patience Wheatcroft commented on the loan to Johnson that Sharp helped to organise and said Sharp did Johnson "a favour just when he wanted the prime minister to give him the top job at the BBC.(...) What the BBC needs in a chairman is impeccable judgment." In Declassified UK, former Guardian defence correspondent Richard Norton-Taylor said: "The Sharp affair is the latest episode in a long history of the close relationship between the BBC and the upper reaches of the British establishment." In further evidence to the Select Committee, in March 2023, John Birt described Sharp as being unsuitable for the job and blamed the Cabinet Secretary for a failure of governance in the appointment.

=== Gary Lineker suspension ===
In response to the suspension of Match of the Day presenter Gary Lineker by the BBC, on 10 March 2023, several politicians and other political commentators called for Sharp's resignation. Labour leader Keir Starmer described Sharp's position as "increasingly untenable", while Mark Ruskell, the culture spokesperson for the Scottish Greens, said: "Richard Sharp must go and go now. Every second he remains trust in the BBC's ability to carry out its functions free from UK Government influence is eroded." Ed Davey, Leader of the Liberal Democrats, called on Sunak to "do the right thing and sack Richard Sharp."

=== Inquiry and resignation ===
The Office of the Commissioner for Public Appointments opened an inquiry into this appointment. On 6 February 2023 the commissioner recused himself as he had "met Sharp on several occasions", and appointed barrister Adam Heppinstall to lead further work.

Heppinstall's report was published on 28 April 2023 and Sharp submitted his resignation, which took effect on 27 June 2023. The Culture Secretary Lucy Frazer thanked him for his work and noted that he was "held in high regard by the BBC board".

== Rowson cartoon ==
On 29 April 2023 The Guardian apologised and removed a cartoon by Martin Rowson, which depicted Sharp in an unfavourable light and was described as containing anti-Semitic tropes, from their website, saying it "does not meet our editorial standards". The historian Simon Sebag Montefiore called it a "repellent explicitly racist cartoon". Rowson himself also apologised, via Twitter.

== Personal life ==
Richard Sharp is Jewish. In 1987, he married Victoria Hull, an American and fellow Goldman Sachs banker, in Connecticut. They have three children together. In October 2008, the couple were living in Kensington, and had an estimated net worth of £500 million. Sharp also has a daughter from a second marriage that has also ended.

Between 2001 and 2019 Sharp gave around £410,000 to the Conservative Party, over 90% of that amount between 2004 and 2010, and £35,000 to the Quilliam think tank via his charity, the Sharp Foundation. When asked why he donated to Quilliam, Sharp said he was impressed by founder Maajid Nawaz's "efforts to combat radicalism and extremism".

Media offices
Preceded by David Clementi	Chair of the BBC Board; 16 February 2021 – 27 June 2023	Succeeded by Elan Closs Stephens as Acting Chair of the BBC Board
