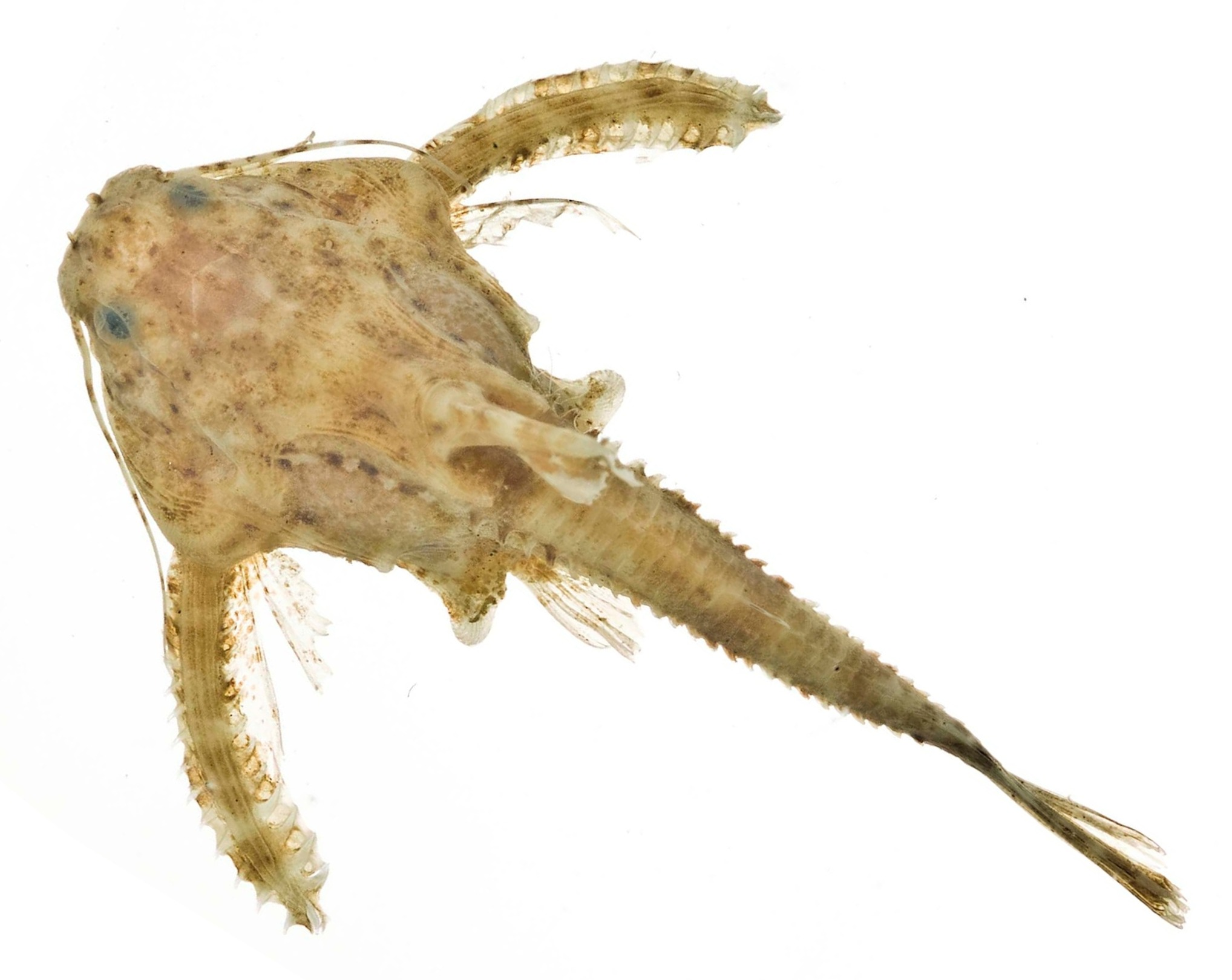

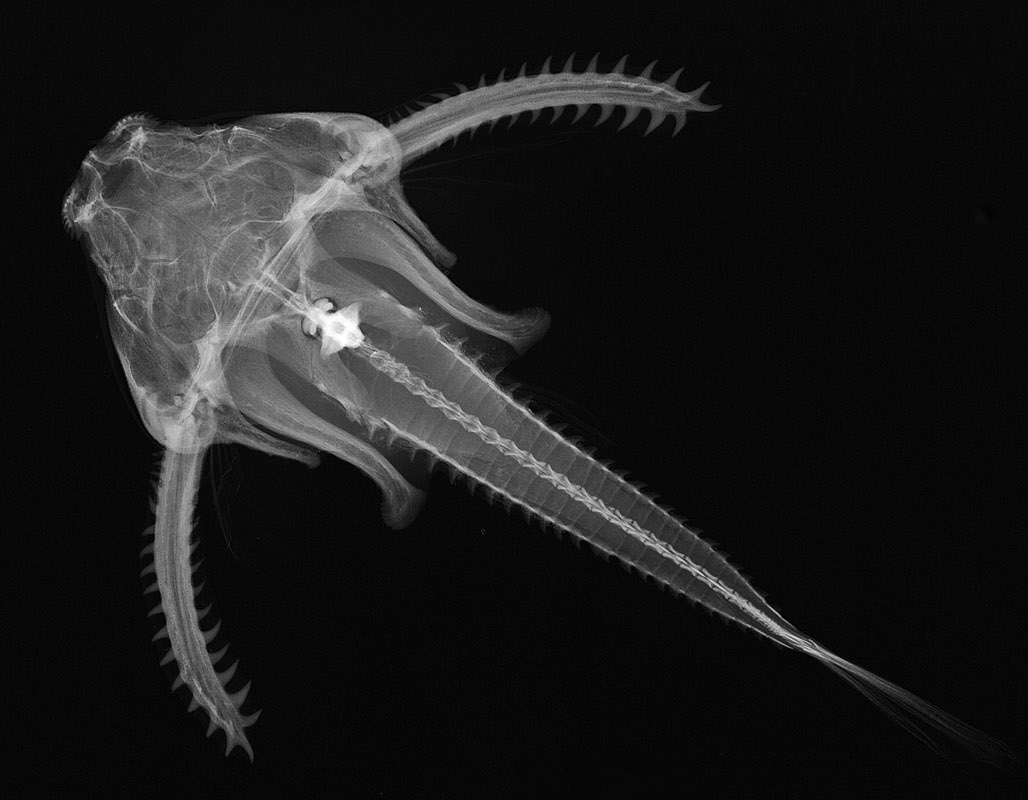
- Physopyxis lyra, conventional and X-ray images

Conservation status
- Least Concern (IUCN 3.1)

Scientific classification
- Kingdom: Animalia
- Phylum: Chordata
- Class: Actinopterygii
- Order: Siluriformes
- Family: Doradidae
- Genus: Physopyxis
- Species: P. lyra

Binomial name
- Physopyxis lyra Cope, 1872

= Physopyxis lyra =

Species of fish

Physopyxis lyra is a species of thorny catfish found in the Essequibo and Amazon basins. It occurs in the countries of Brazil, Colombia, Guyana and Peru. This species grows to a length of 3.5 centimetres (1.4 in) SL. This species prefers to live amongst submerged organic debris.
