= Amblydoras nauticus =

Scientific classification
- Domain: Eukaryota
- Kingdom: Animalia
- Phylum: Chordata
- Class: Actinopterygii
- Order: Siluriformes
- Family: Doradidae
- Genus: Amblydoras
- Species: A. nauticus

Binomial name
- Amblydoras nauticus (Cope, 1874)

Synonyms
- Zathorax nauticus Cope, 1874; Anadoras nauticus (Cope, 1874)

Species of fish

Amblydoras nauticus, the marbled talking catfish or marbled raphael catfish, is a species of thorny catfish endemic to Peru where it is found in the upper Amazon basin. This species grows to a length of 7.5 centimetres (3.0 in) SL.

It is often found in the aquarium trade where commonly mislabelled as "'Amblydoras hancockii" (a synonym of another species, Platydoras hancockii).
