= Physopyxis ananas =

Conservation status
- Least Concern (IUCN 3.1)

Scientific classification
- Kingdom: Animalia
- Phylum: Chordata
- Class: Actinopterygii
- Order: Siluriformes
- Family: Doradidae
- Genus: Physopyxis
- Species: P. ananas

Binomial name
- Physopyxis ananas Sousa & Rapp Py-Daniel, 2005

Species of fish

Physopyxis ananas is a species of thorny catfish found in the lowlands of the Essequibo and Amazon basins. It is found in the countries of Brazil, Guyana, Peru and Venezuela. This species grows to a length of 2.2 centimetres (0.87 in) SL. They prefer to live in submerged organic litter in shallow waters.
