= Justice Sharpe =

Justice Sharpe may refer to:

- Edward M. Sharpe (1887–1975), associate justice of the Michigan Supreme Court
- Henry A. Sharpe (1848–1919), associate justice of the Alabama Supreme Court
- Nelson Sharpe (1858–1935), associate justice of the Michigan Supreme Court
- Robert Sharpe (judge) (born 1945), justice of the Court of Appeal for Ontario

== See also ==
- Justice Sharp (disambiguation)
