= Robert P. Sharp =

American geologist and planetary scientist (1911–2004)

Robert Phillip Sharp (24 June 1911 – 25 May 2004) was an American geomorphologist and expert on the geological surfaces of the Earth and the planet Mars. Sharp served as the chairman of the Division of Geological Sciences at California Institute of Technology (Caltech) from 1952 to 1968. He built the modern department and especially recruited new faculty in geochemistry, tectonic geomorphology, planetary science, and field geology.

== Biography ==
Sharp specialized in geomorphology and published heavily in glacial terrain (the Sierra Nevada, Blue Glacier in the Olympic Peninsula, and Alaska), Mojave Desert terrain, and the Ruby-East Humboldt Range in north-central Nevada. Sharp retired in 1979 but continued leading geological field trips afterwards (with emphasis on the Grand Canyon geology using rubber rafts).

== Biography and education ==
Sharp was a native son of Oxnard, California. He attended Caltech as an undergraduate, beginning in 1930, earning a bachelor's degree (1934) in geology, and master's degree (1935) in geology. While at Caltech, he was quarterback on the football team.

He received a doctorate at Harvard University (1938) in geology under Professor Kirk Bryan.

== Career ==
Sharp served in the United States Army during World War II as an analyst in the Arctic, Desert and Tropical Information Center and achieved the rank of captain. During World War II, Sharp performed extensive field work in the Aleutian Islands of the Alaskan Peninsula, simultaneously testing new arctic clothing for soldiers, and quietly performing geological mapping of several islands, which he published in the Bulletin of the Geological Society of America.

Sharp was briefly an instructor in geology at the University of Illinois at Urbana–Champaign before World War II, and briefly an assistant professor of geology at the University of Minnesota immediately after the war. As soon as possible, Caltech's Division Chairman Ian Campbell arranged for Sharp to return home to Caltech as a full professor in 1947. Sharp remained at Caltech for the next half-century, and was quickly promoted to the Chairman of the Division of Geological Sciences, later renamed to the Division of Geological and Planetary Sciences. At Caltech, Sharp mentored dozens of doctoral students in field geomorphology; these are now working at the United States Geological Survey facility in Menlo Park, California and in leading geology departments throughout North America.

== Research ==
Sharp became a published expert on the glacial geomorphology of the Sierra Nevada range, the Trinity Alps of northwestern California, the Olympic Peninsula of Washington, and Mount Saint Elias in the Fairweather Range of Alaska. In the winter season, he focused his geological field work in the Mojave Desert of California, with emphasis on the geomorphology of Cima Dome, and the sliding stones on the Racetrack Playa in northern Death Valley.

He was an expert on the physics of blown sand and the formation of sand dunes in the Mojave Desert and the Coachella Valley. He was awarded the Kirk Bryan Award by the Geological Society of America for his work on the geomorphology of sand dunes in desert terrain.

Sharp loved weekend field trips, and so he authored a number of field books in geology of southern California, published by Mountain Press. While in his sixties, Sharp continued to teach field geology to Caltech geology students during summer classes at Henry Mountain in Utah, where Grove Karl Gilbert discovered laccoliths.

After retiring from Caltech, Sharp and his wife Jean moved their home from Altadena to Santa Barbara. They had two children.

== Awards and honors ==
- Robert Sharp was a member of the United States National Academy of Sciences and received the National Medal of Science in 1989.
- He won the Penrose Medal from the Geological Society of America, its highest honor.
- Sharp was honored by Caltech as the first named professorship in geology: the Robert Phillip Sharp Chair in Geology.
- The Hungaria asteroid 5426 Sharp, discovered by Carolyn Shoemaker at Palomar Observatory in 1985, was named in his honor. Naming citation was published on 17 March 1995 (M.P.C. 24917).
- On March 28, 2012, NASA named a mountain "Mount Sharp" on the planet Mars, in his honor. The mountain is located at the center of Gale crater, where in August of the same year the Mars rover Curiosity successfully landed. However, on May 16, 2012, Mount Sharp had officially been renamed "Aeolis Mons" by the International Astronomical Union, while a neighboring crater was instead named after the scientist.

== See also ==
- List of craters on Mars
- List of mountains on Mars
- List of mountains on Mars by height
