= Amblydoras gonzalezi =

Scientific classification
- Kingdom: Animalia
- Phylum: Chordata
- Class: Actinopterygii
- Order: Siluriformes
- Family: Doradidae
- Genus: Amblydoras
- Species: A. gonzalezi

Binomial name
- Amblydoras gonzalezi (Fernández-Yépez, 1968)

Synonyms
- Hildadoras bolivarensis Fernández-Yépez, 1968

Species of fish

Amblydoras gonzalezi is a species of thorny catfish found in Colombia and Venezuela. It occurs in the Orinoco River basin and in the Casiquiare canal. This species grows to a length of 9.8 centimetres (3.9 in) SL.

The fish is named in honor of civil engineer Marcelo González Molina (1923-2000), who through his connections, provided the collectors access to the type locality.
