= Eric Sharp, Baron Sharp of Grimsdyke =

British businessman (1916–1994)

The Right Honourable The Lord Sharp of Grimsdyke CBE
- Born: Eric Sharp; 17 August 1916; London, England
- Died: 2 May 1994 (aged 77); London, England
- Occupation: Businessman
- Spouse: Marion Freedman (m. 1950)
- Children: 3, including Richard Sharp and Victoria Sharp

Eric Sharp, Baron Sharp of Grimsdyke, CBE (17 August 1916 – 2 May 1994) was a British businessman and Member of the House of Lords.

== Career ==
Eric Sharp took a degree from the LSE. During WW2, he served in HM British Army. In 1948, he joined the Ministry of Power (1942-1969) as Principal Officer. From 1948–1950, he was UK delegate in the coal and petroleum committees of the Organisation for European Economic Co-operation (OEEC). 1951–1954 he was vice-chairman of the Electricity Committee of the OEEC. 1955–1956 he held the position as Secretary to Herbert Committee of Inquiry into Electricity Supply Industry. 1957–1964 he was marketing manager at British Nylon Spinners Ltd. 1964–1968 he was director of ICI Fibres Ltd. Subsequently, he worked at Monsanto as member of Board of Monsanto Europe in 1969, as member of the Management Board 1970–1972, as deputy chairman of Monsanto Ltd 1973–1974 and as chairman 1975–1981. He was 1980-90 chairman of Cable & Wireless plc and their chief Executive 1981–1990.

== Honours ==
He was appointed a Commander of the Order of the British Empire (CBE) in the 1980 New Year Honours. and became a Knight Bachelor in 1984. On 21 July 1989 he was created a Life Peer as Baron Sharp of Grimsdyke, of Stanmore in the London Borough of Harrow.

== Family ==
In 1950, he married Marion Freedman. They had firstly Nicola (1954–1982), secondly twins Richard Sharp and Victoria Sharp (President of the King's Bench Division of the High Court in England and Wales). Eric and Marion were Jewish and attended Westminster Synagogue.
