= Sharpness (cutting) =

Ability to cut through materials

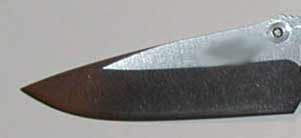
Sharpened metal drop-point blade

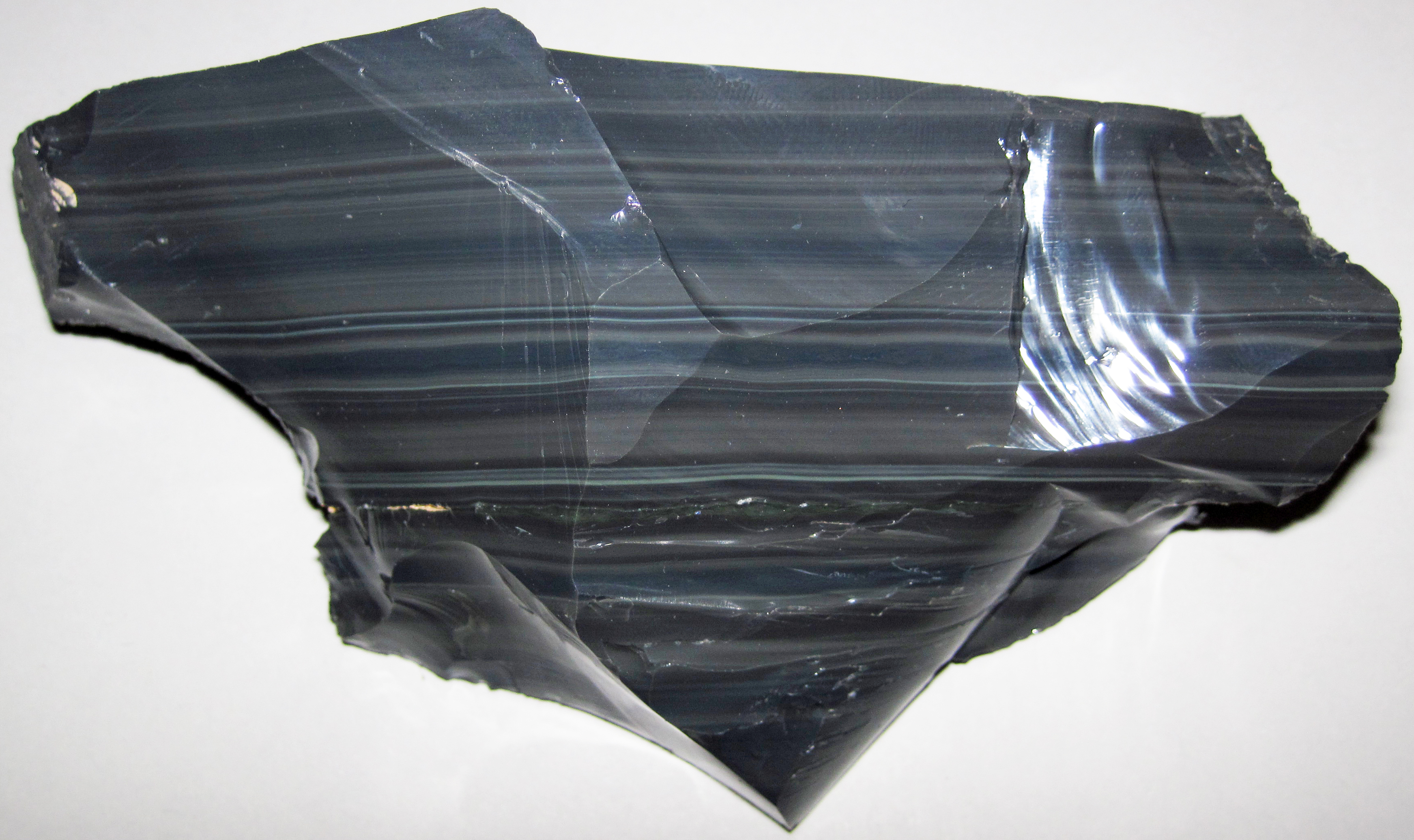
Naturally occurring sharp obsidian piece

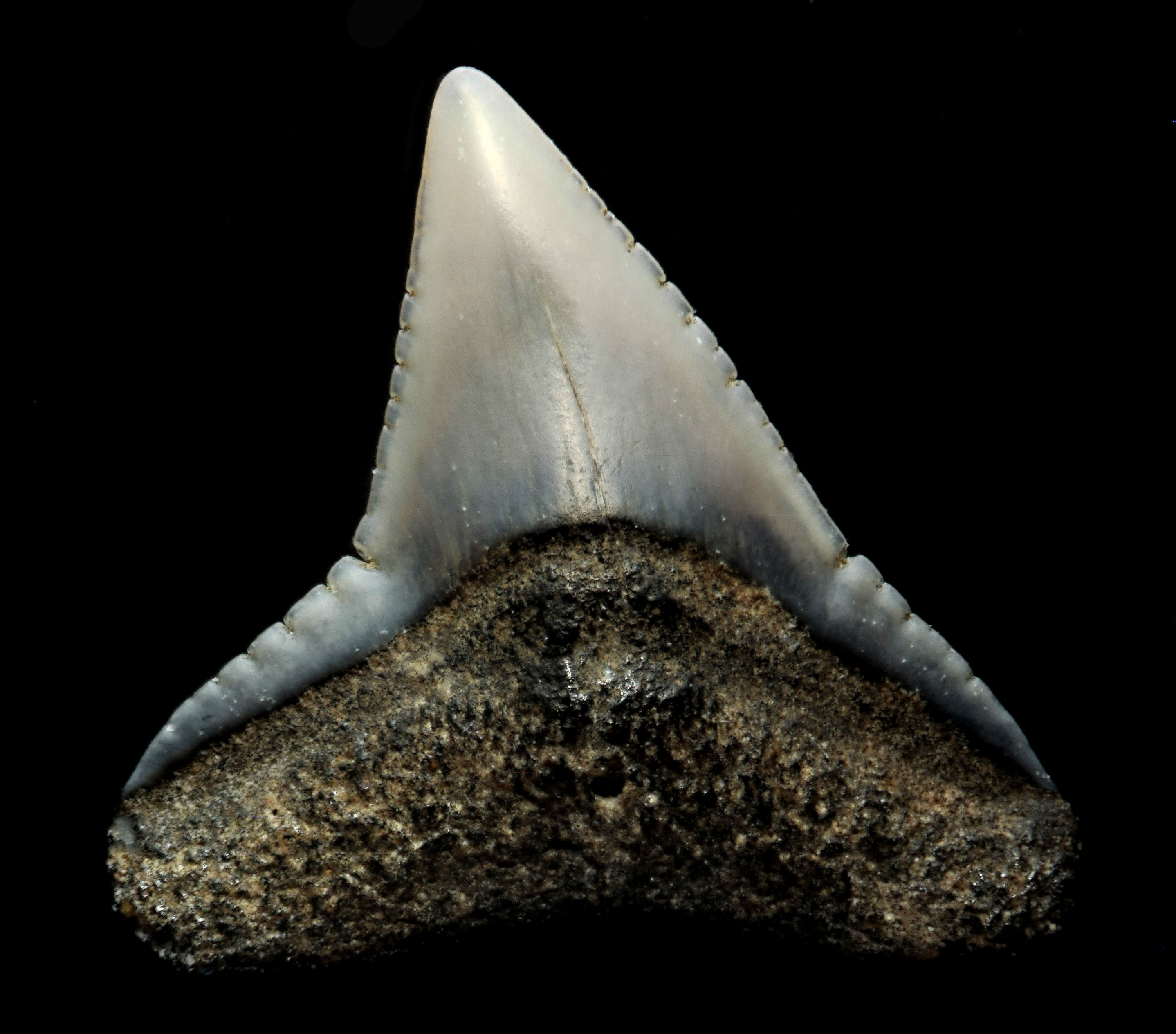
Shark tooth with a sharp, serrated edge

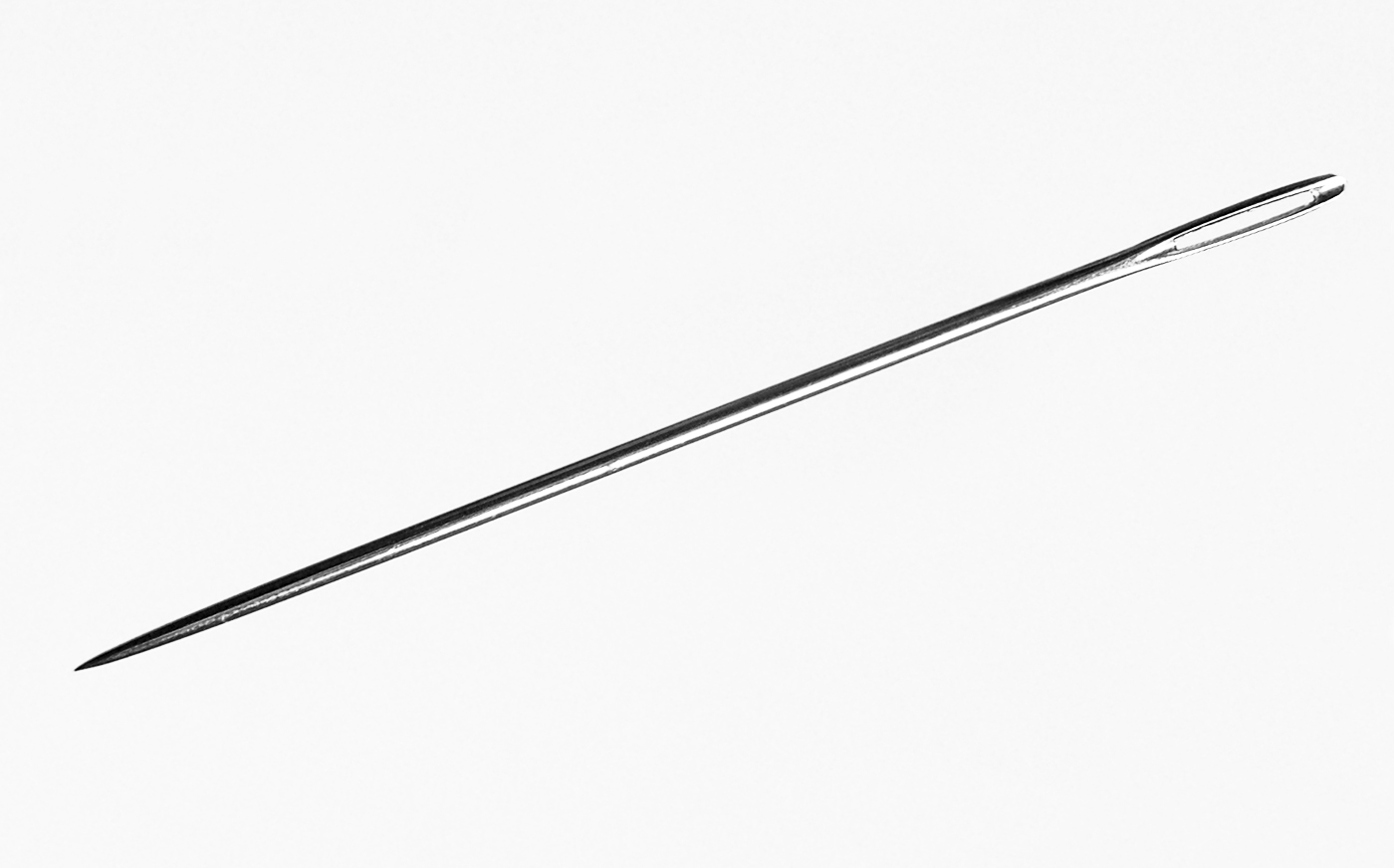
A sewing needle comes to a sharp point

Sharpness refers to the ability of a blade, point, or cutting implement to cut through materials with minimal force, and can more specifically be defined as the capacity of a surface to initiate the cut. Sharpness depends on factors such as the edge angle, edge width, and the fineness of the cutting edge, and is aided by material hardness. This quality is found in a variety of naturally occurring forms, including certain kinds of rock, in plant thorns and spines, and in animal teeth, claws, horns, and other structures serving various purposes. Sharpness is also a critical attribute for man-made tools ranging from kitchen knives and scissors to industrial cutting equipment, as it allows the user of a sharp implement to efficiently penetrate surfaces, or neatly divide other materials into smaller portions as needed.

A balance must be found between the sharpness and durability. Methods that can circumvent this include differential hardening. This method yields an edge that can hold its sharpness as well as a body that is tough. Different methods have been developed to sharpen surfaces, and to test surfaces for relative sharpness.

== In nature ==
Some materials in the environment naturally break with extremely fine edges. A notable example is obsidian, a volcanic glass that fractures in a way that produces edges sharper than most metals can attain. Ancient civilizations utilized obsidian for crafting blades and tools due to its razor-sharp quality, which can be sharp enough to cut at the cellular level. Similarly, materials like flint and chert also fracture with sharp edges, making them useful as early cutting tools. Obsidian is still employed for its natural sharpness, with obsidian scalpels being experimented with in surgery for highly precise cuts.

Sharpness is also a significant evolutionary trait in nature, providing various species with tools for survival. Predatory animals, such as big cats, sharks, and birds of prey, tend to evolve sharp teeth, claws, or beaks to efficiently capture and consume prey. These natural cutting implements are often optimized through narrow angles, and composed of hard materials like enamel. The sharpest teeth in nature are found in great white sharks, and viperfish, respectively, with the great white having serrated cutting teeth and viperfish having piercing needle-like teeth. Some prey animals such as deer and antelope, have similarly evolved sharp horns or antlers to deter attacks, while others, like porcupines and hedgehogs have spines or quills, which create a sharp, defensive barrier. Some herbivores have evolved sharp teeth or claws to access tough plants. For instance, beavers use sharp incisors to chew through wood.

Plants have also developed sharp structures, such as thorns, spines, and prickles, as defensive mechanisms to deter herbivores. These structures, found in species like cacti and roses, have pointed, sometimes serrated edges to maximize damage while requiring minimal energy to maintain.

== In tools ==
Visually, a very sharp knife has an edge that is too small to see with the eye; it may even be hard or impossible to focus in a microscope. The shape near the edge can be highlighted by rotating the knife and watching changes in reflection. Nicks and rolled edges can also be seen, as the rolled edge provides a reflective surface, while a properly straightened edge will be invisible when viewed head-on.

A very sharp tool can produce finer, more controlled cuts. This is particularly important in fields like surgery, culinary arts, and crafting, where precision can affect the quality of the outcome. The sharper the implement, the less pressure the user needs to exert to produce a cut, thus minimizing strain and reducing the risk of accidents. For this reason, sharper tools are often counterintuitively safer than dull ones. While an injury caused by a sharper tool is likely to be more severe, the chance of injury is reduced when the tool is sharp enough to avoid strain in its use. The use of sharp tools also requires personal protective equipment to prevent accidental injuries to their handlers, such as cut-resistant gloves.

=== In human history ===
Early humans made tools from both environmental materials such as sharp stones, and biological materials such as plant spines and animal antlers, for their sharpness. Obsidian scalpels older than 2100 BC have been found in a Bronze Age settlement in Turkey.

== Measurement and quantification ==
Sharpness may be measured for various purposes. For example, with animal teeth, "tooth cusp sharpness is commonly measured by radius of curvature (RoC), where cusps with higher RoCs are duller and cusps with lower RoCs are sharper. During interactions between single cusps and food items, sharper cusps reduce the contact area between the tooth and the food item, leading to a reduction in energy and reaction force needed to induce a fracture in the food item".

The sharpness of a forged blade can be quantified according to the Blade Sharpness Index (BSI), which categorizes blades based on the force required to make a cut through a standardized material. This index provides a comparative measure, helping users assess and compare blade sharpness with precision. A higher sharpness index generally indicates a finer cutting edge, which requires less force to penetrate or slice through a test medium. Methods have similarly been formulated for testing the sharpness of points.

== See also ==
- Serration
- Sharpening
