= Amblydoras =

Scientific classification
- Kingdom: Animalia
- Phylum: Chordata
- Class: Actinopterygii
- Order: Siluriformes
- Family: Doradidae
- Subfamily: Astrodoradinae
- Genus: Amblydoras; Bleeker, 1862

Type species
- Doras affinis Kner 1855

Synonyms
- Zathorax Cope, 1871; Merodoras Higuchi, Birindelli, Sousa & Britski, 2007

Genus of fishes

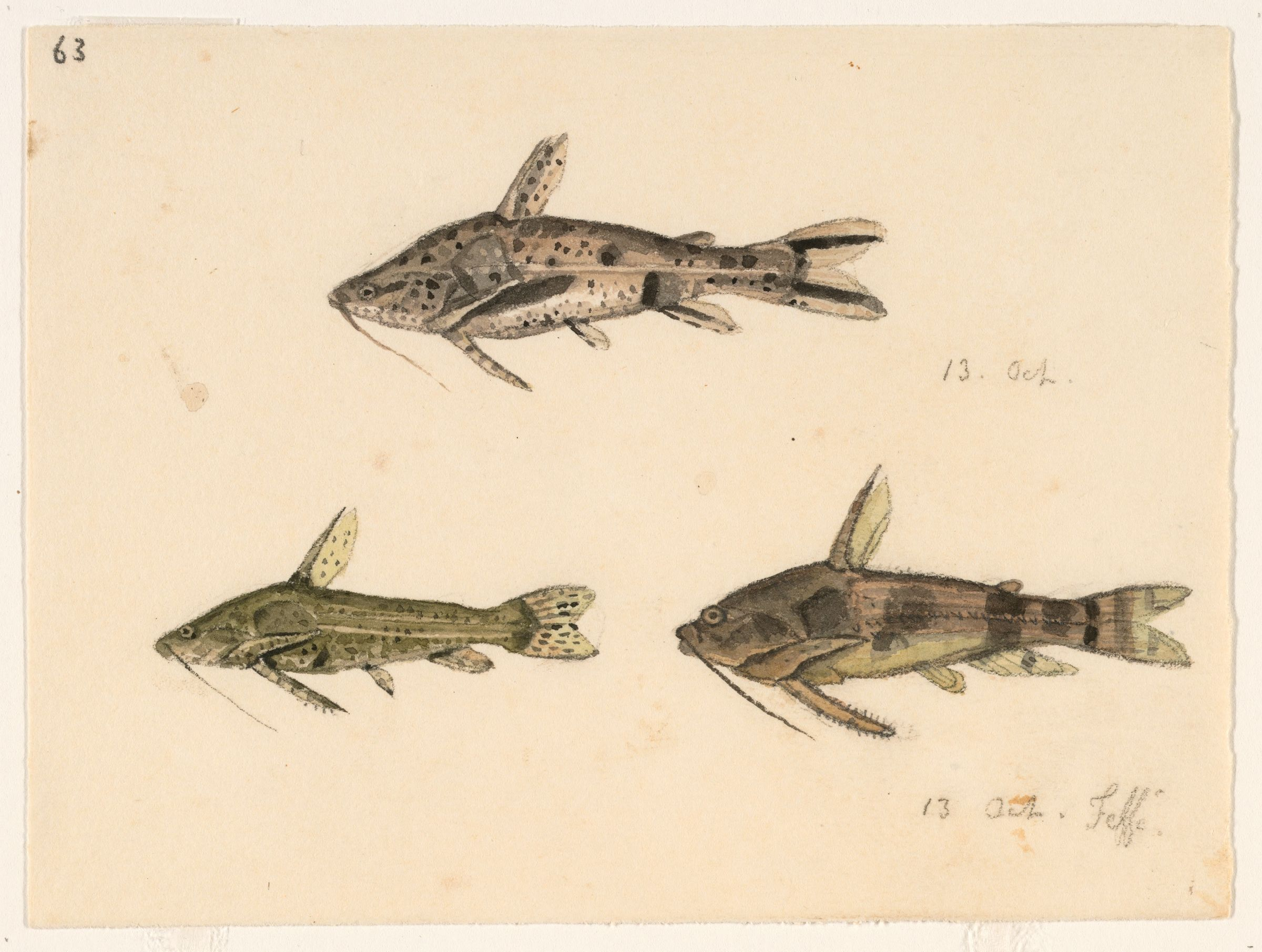

Amblydoras is a genus of thorny catfishes native to rivers in tropical South America.

Amblydoras is one of several genera classified within the subfamily Astrodoradinae.

Amblydoras species range from about 7.5–10.2 centimetres (3–4 in) SL.

== Species ==
There are currently five recognized species in this genus:

- Amblydoras affinis (Kner, 1855)
- Amblydoras gonzalezi (Fernández-Yépez, 1968)
- Amblydoras monitor (Cope, 1872)
- Amblydoras nauticus (Cope, 1874)
- Amblydoras nheco (Higuchi, Birindelli, Sousa & Britski, 2007)
