= Sharp (flour) =

Sharp flour is made from hard wheat. It is a term used by millers in Fiji and is in common usage throughout the populace as evidenced by newspaper reports whenever the price of flour changes, with the new price of sharp listed. Sharp is used as an ingredient for roti in Fiji.
