= Sharp Scale =

Measure of paper opacity

The Sharp Scale was devised by Henrietta Sharp Cockrell as an objective and scientific way to measure the opacity of paper, particularly of manuscript folios, 'in the field' without specialized equipment. A practical application of the technique could be done in a museum or library setting. To apply the method, the folio is first held at a distance of 15 cm from a 60 watt light source (such as an unshaded table lamp). A dowel (or pencil) is held behind and against it, creating a silhouette. Folios are then added until the outline of the pencil is no longer visible. The number of the folios needed to obscure the silhouette of the pencil is recorded.
