= Victoria Sharp =

British jurist (born 1956)

The Right Honourable Dame Victoria Sharp DBE
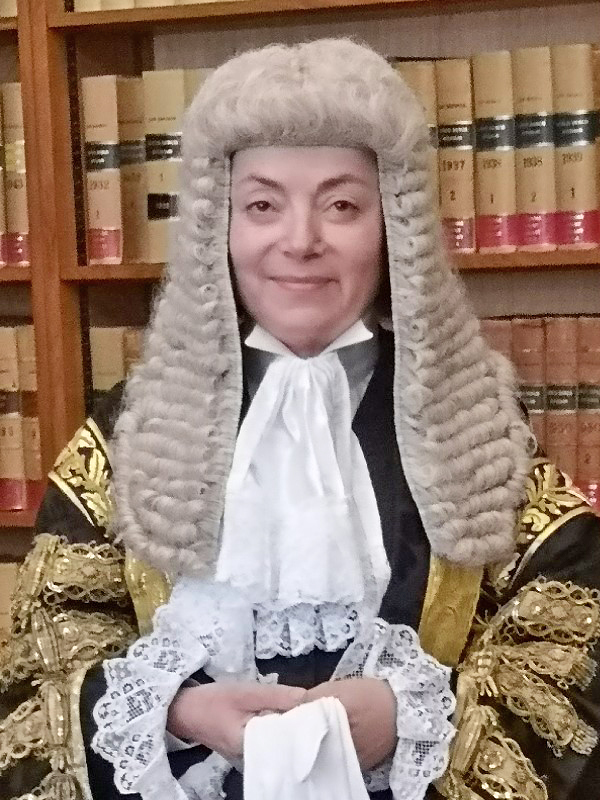
- Sharp in 2019

President of the King's Bench Division
- In office 23 June 2019 – 30 September 2026
- Monarchs: Elizabeth II; Charles III
- Preceded by: Sir Brian Leveson
- Succeeded by: Sir Mark Warby

Lady Justice of Appeal
- In office 2013–2019

Justice of the High Court
- In office 2009–2013

Personal details
- Born: Victoria Madeleine Sharp; 8 February 1956 (age 70)
- Education: University of Bristol

Dame Victoria Madeleine Sharp, DBE (born 8 February 1956) is a British judge. She was the President of the King's Bench Division of the High Court of Justice from 2019 until her retirement in September 2026.

== Early life and education ==
She is the daughter of The Lord Sharp of Grimsdyke. Her twin brother is Richard Sharp, a former Goldman Sachs banker, and former Chairman of the BBC. She is of Jewish faith. She was educated at North London Collegiate School and the University of Bristol.

== Career ==
Sharp was called to the Bar by the Inner Temple in 1979 and joined 1 Brick Court in 1982, mainly practising in defamation and media law. She became a Recorder in 1998, and a QC in 2001.

She was appointed Dame Commander of the Order of the British Empire (DBE), as is customary, on her appointment as a Justice of the High Court on 13 January 2009.

She was Presiding Judge of the Western Circuit from 2012 to 2013, and was appointed a Lady Justice of Appeal in 2013. She became Vice-President of the Queen's Bench Division on 1 January 2016, succeeding Sir Nigel Davis. She became President of the Queen's Bench Division from 23 June 2019 succeeding Sir Brian Leveson.

In 2023, it was reported that she was on the final shortlist to become Lord Chief Justice, alongside Dame Sue Carr, who was selected for the post.

On 14 January 2026, it was announced that she will be retiring from her role as President of the King's Bench Division and as a judge in October 2026.

On 13 February 2026, Sharp ruled in favour of the Palestine Action ban being considered unlawful.

== Personal life ==
Sharp married a doctor; she had four children within five years. Nevertheless, she remained in full-time law practice during those years, not taking leave. "She was convinced that if she had not dedicated herself to her job as she did by rejecting any leave on the birth of any of her children, she would have been significantly disadvantaged; as she puts it, "if you were not there in Chambers, you did not receive briefs and you had no job."
