= Serration =

Saw-like appearance; a row of sharp projections on an edge

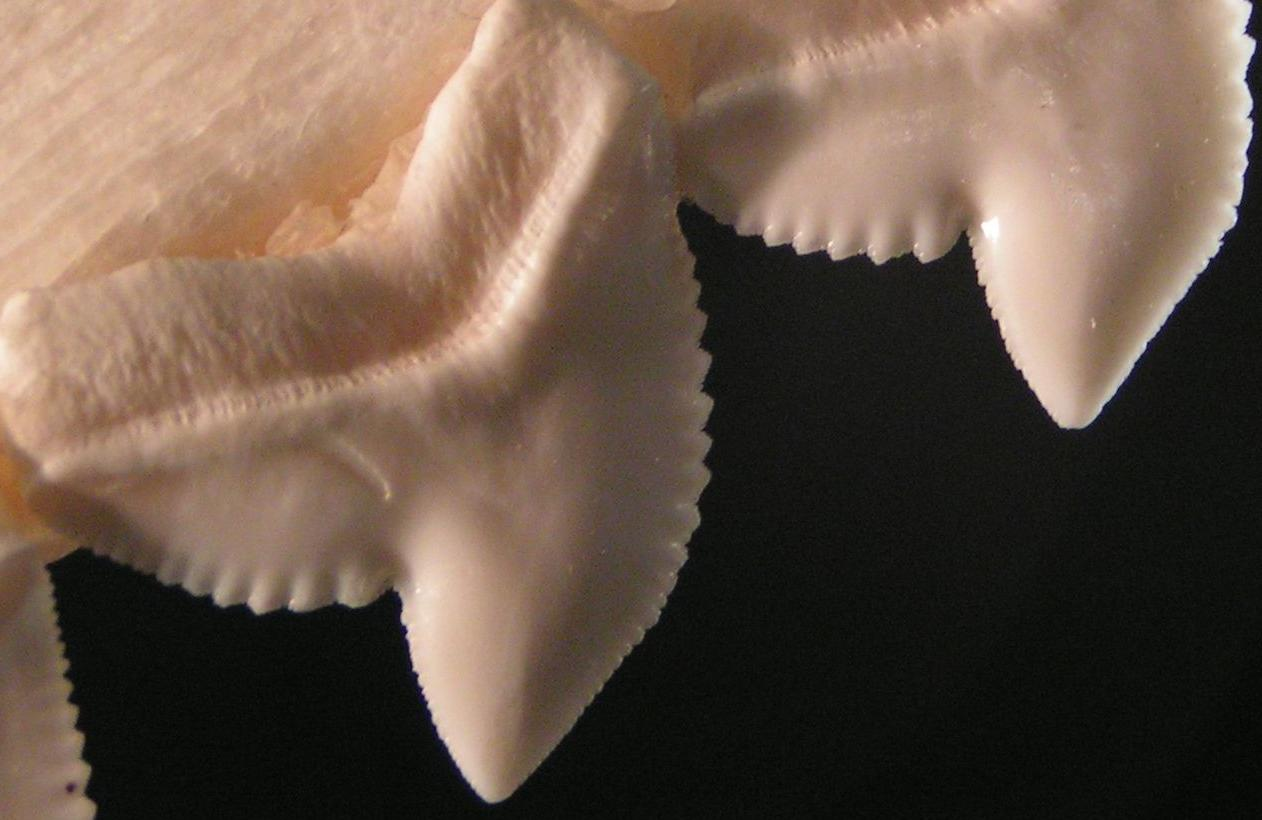
The serrated edges of tiger shark teeth

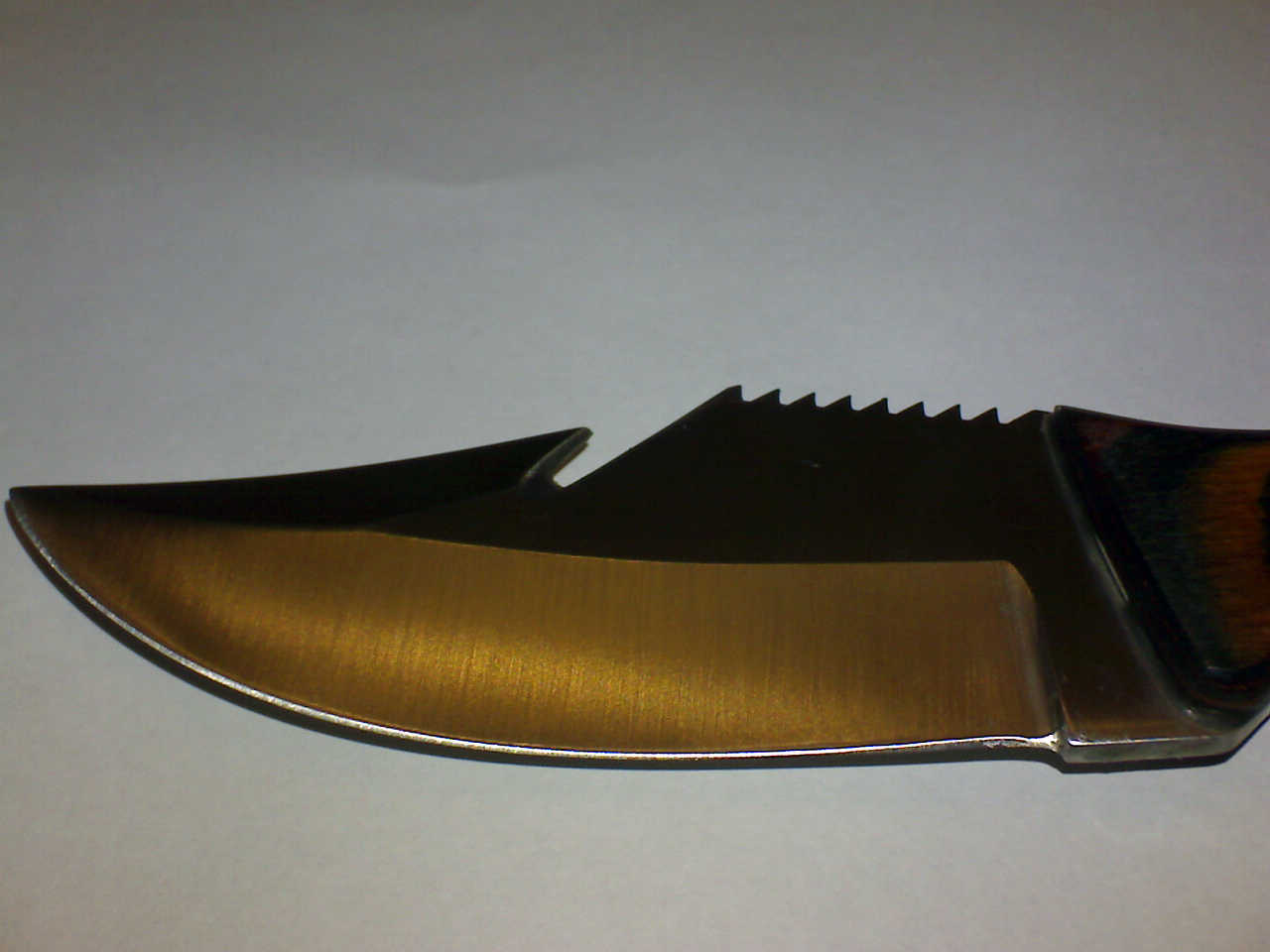
A hunting knife with a serrated back edge

Serration is a saw-like appearance or a row of sharp or tooth-like projections. A serrated cutting edge has many small points of contact with the material being cut. By having less contact area than a smooth blade or other edge, the applied pressure at each point of contact is greater, and the points of contact are at a sharper angle to the material being cut. This causes a cutting action that involves many small splits in the surface of the material being cut, which cumulatively serve to cut the material along the line of the blade.

== Serration in nature ==
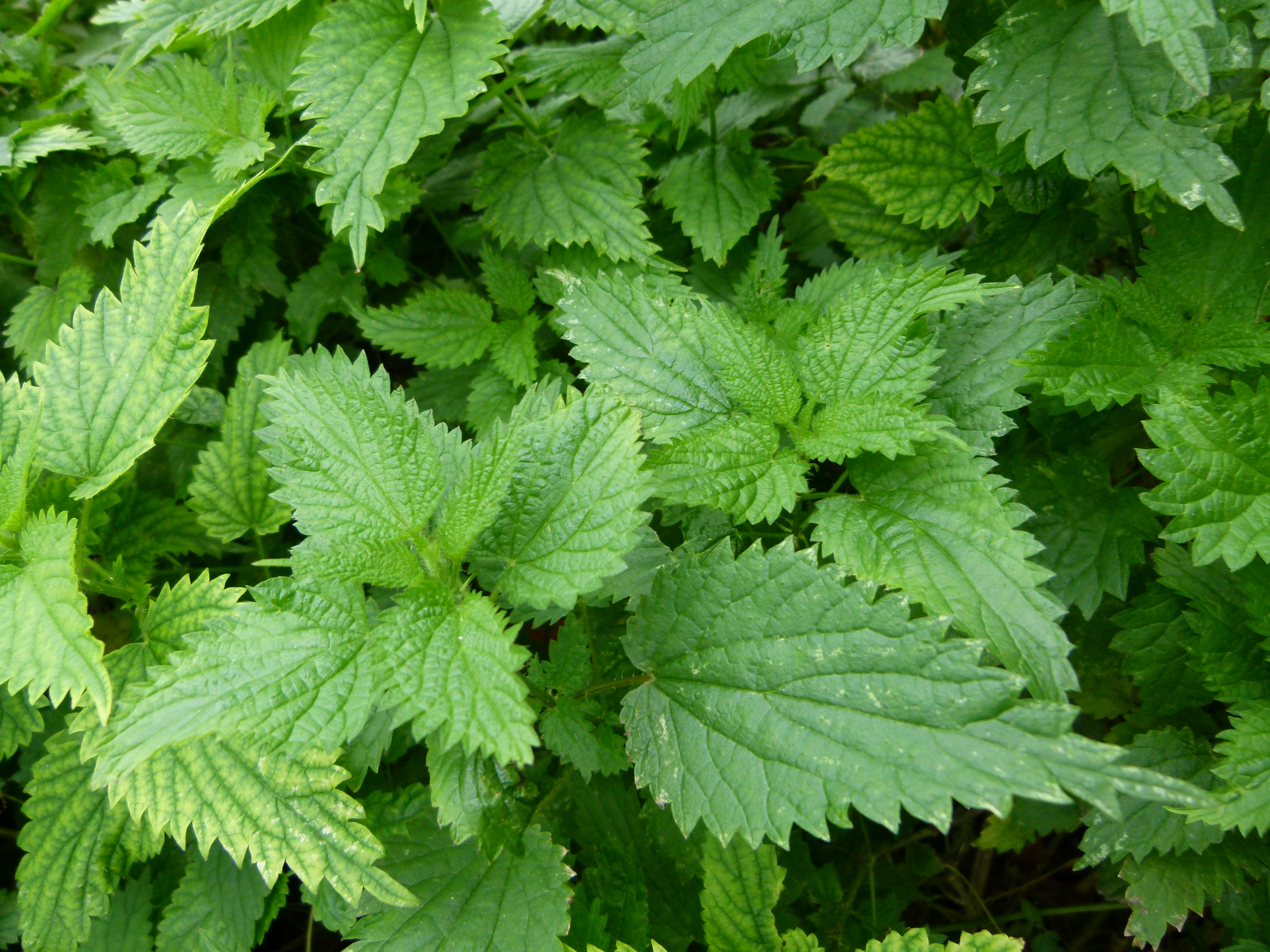
Serrated leaves of the stinging nettle, Urtica dioica

In nature, serration is commonly seen in the cutting edge on the teeth of some species, usually sharks. However, it also appears on non-cutting surfaces, for example, in botany where a toothed leaf margin or other plant part, such as the edge of a carnation petal, is described as being serrated. A serrated leaf edge may reduce the force of wind and other natural elements. Probably the largest serrations on Earth occur on the skylines of mountains (the Spanish word sierra, as in the Sierra Nevada, means a saw). These occur due to the uneven action of landform edges pushing rock upwards, and the uneven action of erosion.

Human uses of serration have copied, and gone beyond, those found in nature. For example, the teeth on a saw or other serrated blade serve a similar cutting or scraping purpose as the serration of an animal tooth. Tailors use pinking shears to cut cloth with a serrated edge, which, somewhat counterintuitively, reduces fraying by reducing the average length of a thread that may be pulled from the edge. A type of serration is also found in airframe shapes used in certain stealth aircraft, which use the jaggedness of the serrated edge to deflect radar signals from seams and edges where a straight, non-serrated edge would reflect radar signals to the source. Screw threads show serration in profile, although they are usually shown in abbreviated or symbolic fashion on mechanical drawings to save time and ink. Brogue shoes are made with serrated edges on the leather pieces, for no known purpose at all other than style. The step clamp and step block assembly in metalworking adopt serration for the purpose of applying clamping pressure from an adjustable position.

== Serration in blades ==
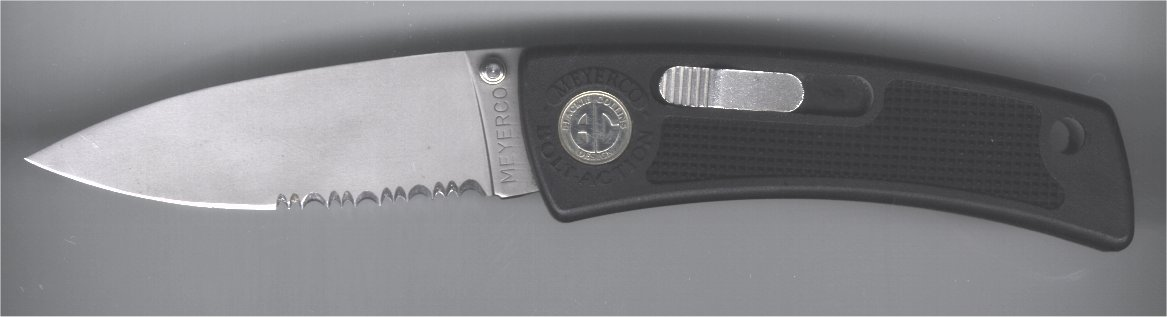
A Meyerco bolt action knife, designed by Blackie Collins, and featuring a partially serrated blade.

Humans have used serrated blades since the Mesolithic era, when prehistoric humans made these from flint. A serrated blade has a toothlike rather than a plain edge, and is used on saws and on some knives and scissors. It is also known as a dentated, sawtooth, or toothed blade. Many such blades are scalloped, having edges cut with curved notches, common on wood saws and bread knives.

With kitchen knives, the finer serrated edge is found typically on paring and cheese knives, particularly for slicing harder cheeses like cheddar or Wensleydale. The wider scalloped-edge serrations are found on practically all bread knives and typically on fruit knives. These serrated knives are better able to cut through a firmer or tougher outer crust or skin without crushing the softer and more delicate inner crumb or flesh.

Serrations give the blade's cutting edge less contact area than a smooth blade, which increases the applied pressure at each point of contact, and the points of contact are at a sharper angle to the material being cut. This causes a cutting action that involves many small splits in the surface of the material being cut, which cumulatively serve to cut the material along the line of the blade.

Cuts made with a serrated blade are typically less smooth and precise than cuts made with a smooth blade. Serrated edges can be difficult to sharpen using a whetstone or rotary sharpener intended for straight edges but can be sharpened with ceramic or diamond coated rods. Further, they tend to stay sharper longer than similar straight edges. A serrated blade has a faster cut, but a plain edge has a cleaner cut. Some prefer a serrated blade on a pocket knife or on an emergency rescue knife, especially with the latter for its increased ability to cut through cords, ropes, and safety belts.

=== Types of blade serration ===
- Tooth serration — Vertical serration along edge of blade
- Single edge serration — Serration on one side, the other remains flat
- Double edge serration — Serration on both sides
- Fan serration — Side-to-side serration without necessarily having a toothed edge
  - Micro-serration — Serration much smaller than thickness of blade creating something like a fan pattern

== See also ==
- Sharpness (cutting)
