= Physopyxis cristata =

Conservation status
- Least Concern (IUCN 3.1)

Scientific classification
- Kingdom: Animalia
- Phylum: Chordata
- Class: Actinopterygii
- Order: Siluriformes
- Family: Doradidae
- Genus: Physopyxis
- Species: P. cristata

Binomial name
- Physopyxis cristata Sousa & Rapp Py-Daniel, 2005

Species of fish

Physopyxis cristata is a species of thorny catfish endemic to Brazil where it is found in the Rio Negro basin. This species grows to a length of 2.27 centimetres (0.89 in) SL. This species prefers to live amongst submerged leaf litter.
