= Edward M. Sharpe =

American judge (1887–1975)

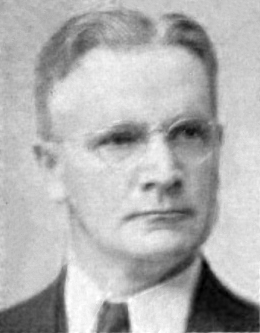
Edward M. Sharpe c. 1955

Edward M. Sharpe (December 18, 1887 – March 3, 1975) was a justice of the Michigan Supreme Court from 1934 to 1957.

Born on a farm in Bay County, Michigan, Sharpe attended the public schools and the Ferris Institute, and received a law degree from the University of Michigan Law School in 1914.

In 1933, Sharpe defeated incumbent John S. McDonald to be elected to the supreme court.

Political offices
Preceded by John S. McDonald	Justice of the Michigan Supreme Court; 1934–1957	Succeeded by John D. Voelker
