= Fibres Research Centre =

- ICI Fibres
- Location within North Yorkshire

General information
- Type: Textiles Research Centre
- Location: Hookstone Road, Harrogate, North Yorkshire, HG2 4QN
- Coordinates: 53.98°N 1.525°W
- Elevation: 90 m (295 ft)
- Construction started: 1956
- Completed: 1956
- Client: ICI Fibres

The Fibres Research Centre was a research centre of ICI in Harrogate in North Yorkshire. The site today is a redeveloped business park.

== History ==
ICI Fibres was formed on 1 April 1956, and all textile research for ICI moved to Harrogate.

The fibres were made by ICI at a plant at Kilroot in County Antrim, Northern Ireland.

== Structure ==
It was sited in the south-west of North Yorkshire.

== See also ==
- Winnington Laboratory
