= 5426 Sharp =

Hungaria asteroid and suspected binary system

Discovery
- Discovered by: C. Shoemaker
- Discovery site: Palomar Obs.
- Discovery date: 16 February 1985

Designations
- Named after: Robert P. Sharp (American geomorphologist)
- Alternative designations: 1985 DD
- Minor planet category: main-belt · (inner); Hungaria

Orbital characteristics
- Epoch 4 September 2017 (JD 2458000.5)
- Uncertainty parameter 0
- Observation arc: 31.94 yr (11,667 days)
- Aphelion: 2.1828 AU
- Perihelion: 1.7273 AU
- Semi-major axis: 1.9550 AU
- Eccentricity: 0.1165
- Orbital period (sidereal): 2.73 yr (998 days)
- Mean anomaly: 319.59°
- Mean motion: 0° 21^{m} 38.16^{s} / day
- Inclination: 23.795°
- Longitude of ascending node: 88.178°
- Argument of perihelion: 67.532°
- Known satellites: 1 (suspected; P: 24.22 h)

Physical characteristics
- Dimensions: 2.033±0.343 km 3.85 km (calculated)
- Synodic rotation period: 4.56±0.01 h 4.5609±0.0001 h (Note: Three lightcurve plots of (5426) Sharp, obtained by Brian D. Warner in collaboration with Vladimir Benishek and Andrea Ferrero between December 2014 and January 2015)
- Geometric albedo: 0.30 (assumed); 1.000±0.000
- Spectral type: E
- Absolute magnitude (H): 13.7 · 14.0 · 15.16±0.21

5426 Sharp, provisional designation 1985 DD, is a bright Hungaria asteroid and suspected binary system from the inner regions of the asteroid belt, approximately 2–3 kilometers in diameter. It was discovered on 16 February 1985, by American astronomer Carolyn Shoemaker at Palomar Observatory, California, and named after American geologist Robert P. Sharp.

== Classification and orbit ==
Sharp is a bright E-type asteroid and a member of the Hungaria family, which form the innermost dense concentration of asteroids in the Solar System. It orbits the Sun in the inner main-belt at a distance of 1.7–2.2 AU once every 2 years and 9 months (998 days). Its orbit has an eccentricity of 0.12 and an inclination of 24° with respect to the ecliptic. The body's observation arc begins with its official discovery observation at Palomar, as no precoveries were taken, and no prior identifications were made.

== Diameter and albedo ==
According to the surveys carried out by NASA's Wide-field Infrared Survey Explorer with its subsequent NEOWISE mission, Sharp measures 2.033 kilometers in diameter, and its surface has an outstandingly high albedo of 1.000. The Collaborative Asteroid Lightcurve Link assumes an albedo of 0.30 – a compromise value between 0.4 and 0.2, corresponding to the Hungaria asteroids both as family and orbital group – and calculates a diameter of 3.85 kilometers with an absolute magnitude of 14.0.

The high albedo derived from the WISE-observations indicate that Sharp belongs to the collisional Hungaria asteroids (rather than just its orbital group), which is thought to have originated from the same parent body that shattered into fragments in an ancient asteroid collision. The high albedo is due to the magnesium-rich mineral enstatite, which led to the E-type in the asteroid spectral type taxonomy.

== Suspected binary ==
A first rotational lightcurve of Sharp was obtained in November 2011, from photometric observations by American astronomer Brian Warner at his Palmer Divide Observatory (716) in Colorado (U=2). Lightcurve analysis indicated the possibility that Sharp could be orbited by a minor-planet moon nearly every 24 hours.

In 2014/15, Sharp was re-examined by Brian Warner in a collaboration with astronomers Vladimir Benishek at Belgrade Astronomical Observatory, Serbia, and Andrea Ferrero at Bigmuskie Observatory in Italy (B88). The European collaboration was required because the satellite's orbital period was expected to be almost exactly an Earth day, and therefore synchronous with Earth, which would have made it impossible to obtain photometric data points covering the entire lightcurve from just one single location.

The obtained lightcurves from the combined photometric observations gave a well-defined rotation period of 4.5609 hours, a brightness variation of 0.18 magnitude (U=3), and orbital period of 24.22 hours for the asteroid's moon. However, as no mutual occultation/eclipsing events were observed, the binary nature of Sharp remains unconfirmed. The "Johnstonsarchive" estimates that the moon has a semi-major axis of 4.5 kilometers. No diameter estimate for the moon was published, as a secondary-to-primary mean-diameter ratio could not be derived.

== Naming ==
This minor planet was named in honor of American geomorphologist Robert P. Sharp (1911–2004), American professor of geology at Caltech, expert on glaciers, the movement of sand dunes and the geology of Mars. The Martian crater Robert Sharp and mountain Mount Sharp (now officially Aeolis Mons), were named in his honor. Mount Sharp rises from the middle of Gale Crater, which is explored by the Mars Curiosity rover since 2012. The approved naming citation was published by the Minor Planet Center on 17 March 1995 (M.P.C. 24917).
