= Sharp (automobile) =

Defunct American motor vehicle manufacturer

Two automobiles were manufactured during the Brass Era of automobiles. The earliest was the Sharp Arrow built by the Sharp Arrow Automobile Company in Trenton New Jersey from 1908 to 1910. The second was the SEM or Sharp cyclecar built by the Sharp Engineering & Manufacturing Company in Detroit, Michigan in 1914.

== Sharp Arrow Automobile Company ==
Sharp Arrow Automobile Company
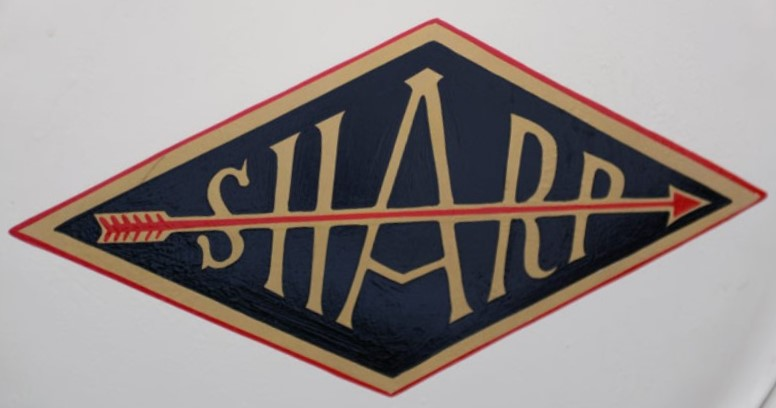
- Speed King of American Stock Cars
- Industry: Automotive
- Founded: 1908; 118 years ago
- Founder: William H. Sharp
- Defunct: 1910; 116 years ago
- Fate: Closed
- Headquarters: Trenton, New Jersey, United States
- Key people: William H. Sharp, Fred Sharp
- Products: Automobiles
- Production output: 19-25 (1909-1910)

William H. Sharp had a photography studio and a Mitchell car dealership at the corner of South Clinton Avenue and Beatty Street in Trenton. In 1908 he built a racing machine which he entered in a number of East Coast events, including the Long Island Sweepstakes where he won his class. The name Sharp Arrow was used for his fast car and with the publicity gained from racing, Sharp decided to produce the car. In December 1908 the Sharp Arrow Automobile Company was organized. William Sharp was joined by his brother Fred, who was also race mechanic, and local businessmen A. N. Yetter, F. W. Bennett and J. R. Farlee.

The Roeblings agreed to produce the car for them in the Trenton plant where the Walter was being built. Later, the new Mercer would be built there. The Sharp Arrow was offered as a runabout, speedabout, toy tonneau and touring car. Priced between $2,750 and $2,850 (equivalent to $102,125 in 2025) the car featured a Continental 40-hp 4-cylinder L-head engine on a choice of a 106 or 116-inch wheelbase.

In early 1910 word of the car had reached W. Burnett Easton, president of the International Boiler Company in Stroudsburg, Pennsylvania. He negotiated with Sharp a contract where the International Boiler Company acquired the patent rights to the Sharp Arrow car with both William and Fred Sharp to join the firm as managing partners. Production was to be greatly stepped up after moving the entire venture to Stroudsburg.

William Sharp tweaked his Sharp Arrow race car so that its four-cylinder 40 hp engine raised its top speed from 80 to 90 mph and he took the car to the Grand Prize race in Savannah, Georgia. On November 10, 1910 William Sharp and his mechanic were killed during a practice run, when their car overturned. Fred Sharp had not been the mechanic for the practice run. This tragedy was preceded by the death of W. Burnett Easton of the International Boiler Company who was killed in a train accident on November 5. The Sharp Arrow died too, never making the move to Stroudsburg.

=== Sharp Arrow Advertisements ===
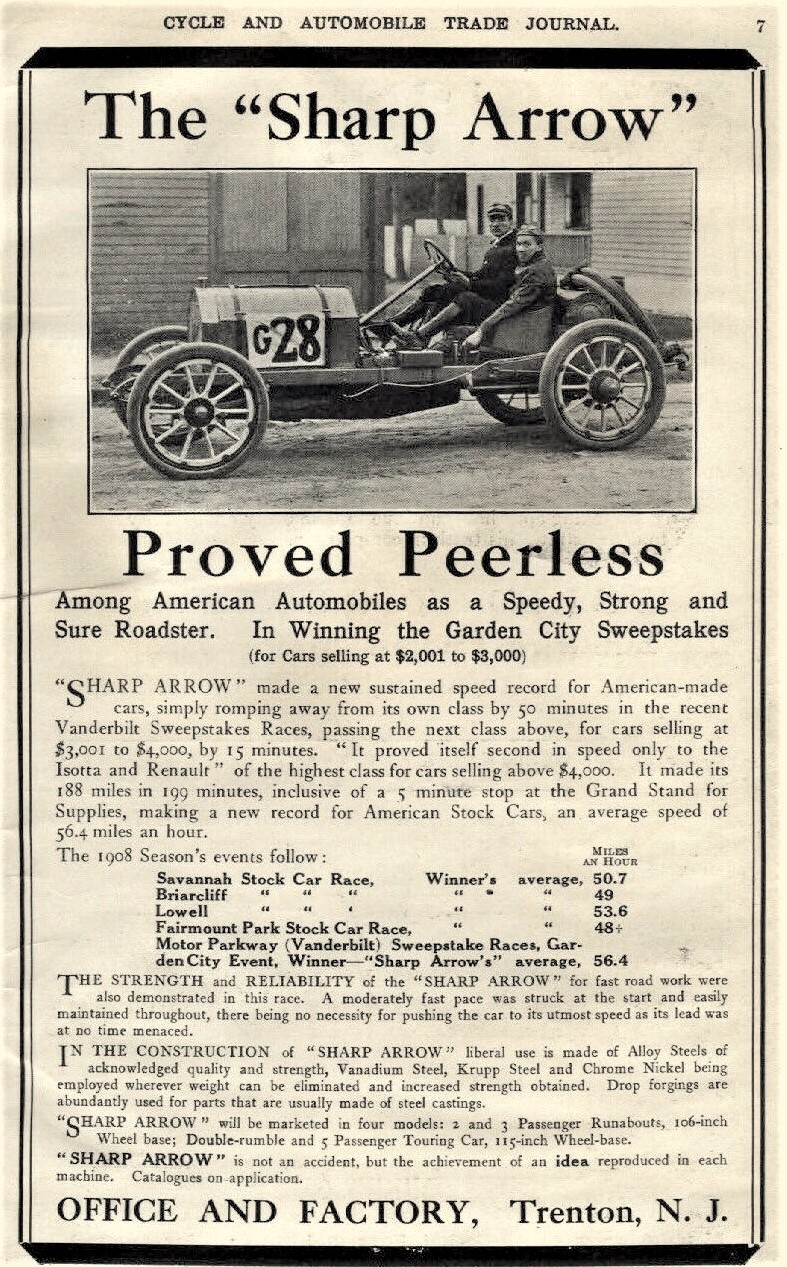
1908 Sharp Arrow advertisement in Cycle and Automobile Trade Journal

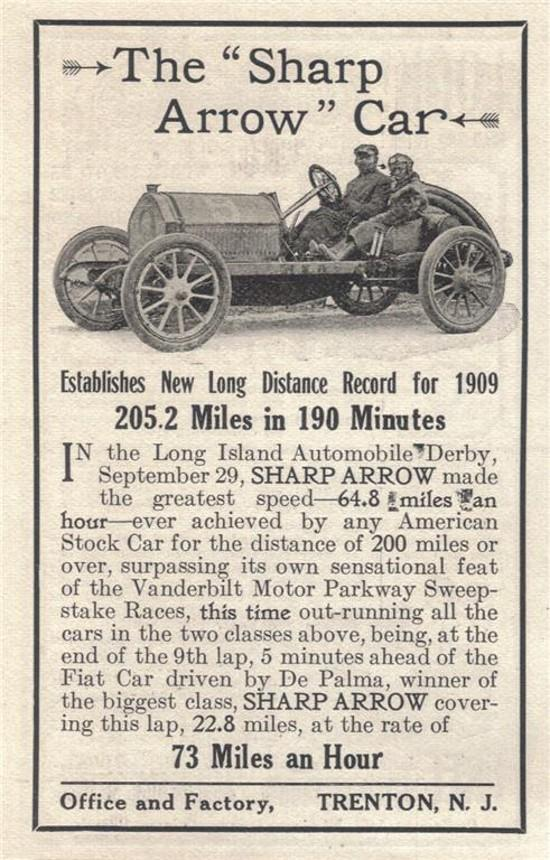
1909 Sharp Arrow race achievements in Cycle and Automobile Trade Journal

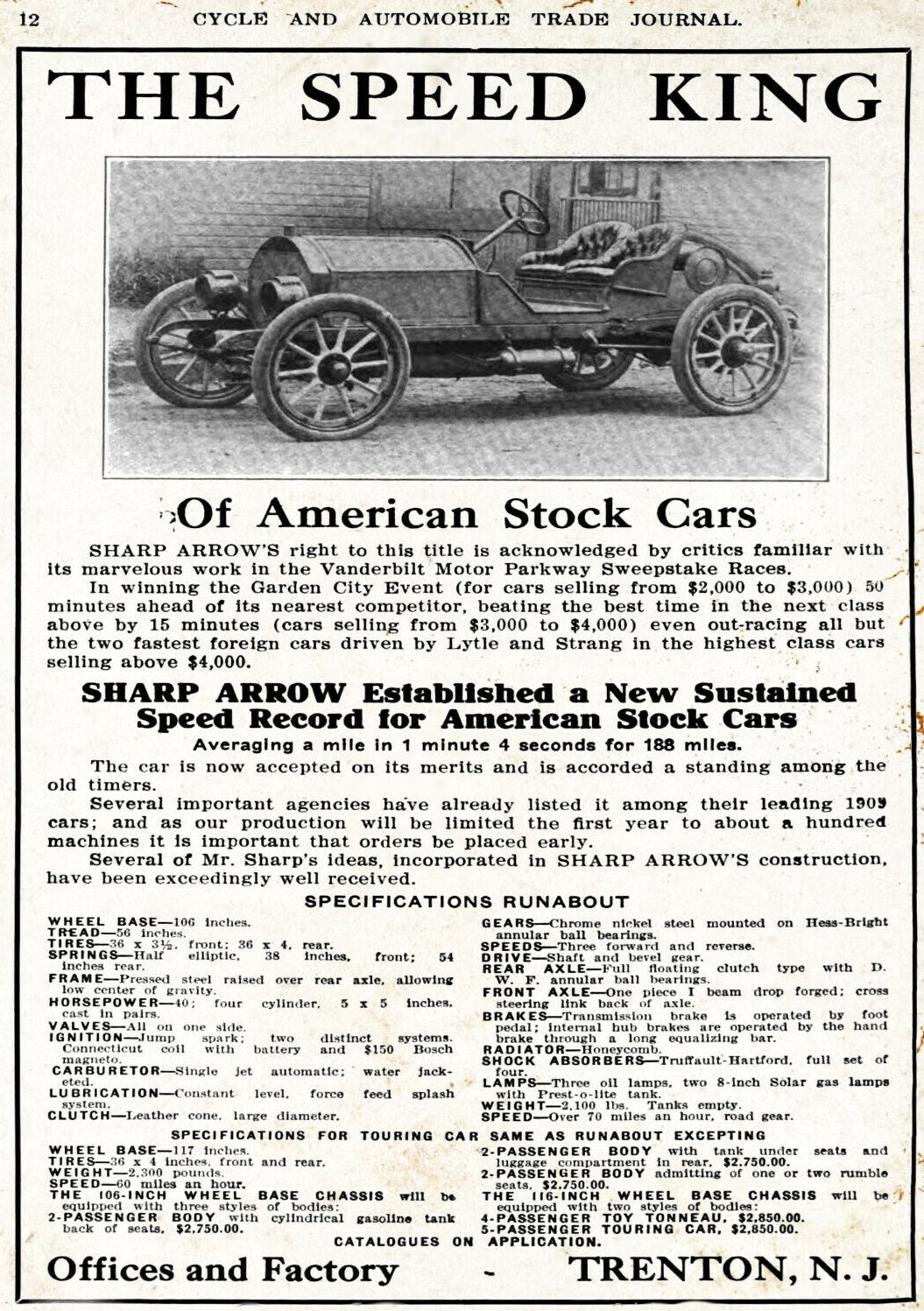
1909 Sharp Arrow advertisement in Cycle and Automobile Trade Journal

== Sharp Engineering & Manufacturing Company ==
The Sharp cyclecar, introduced as the S.E.M., was manufactured by the Sharp Engineering & Manufacturing Company in Detroit, Michigan in 1914. It was a two-seater cyclecar priced at $295, equivalent to $9,482 in 2025. Built with an 800cc, 2-cylinder air-cooled engine, it had a 2-speed gearbox and shaft drive.

In October 1914 Sharp announced it would construct a standard sized six-cylinder automobile priced at $1,000. Those plans fell through before the end of the year.
