= Sharps Run (Cow Creek tributary) =

Stream in West Virginia, U.S.

Coordinates: 39°19′08″N 81°14′23″W

Sharps Run is a stream in the U.S. state of West Virginia. It is a tributary of Cow Creek.

Sharps Run bears the name of a pioneer settler.
