= Zbigniew Przybyszewski =

Naval officer of Poland

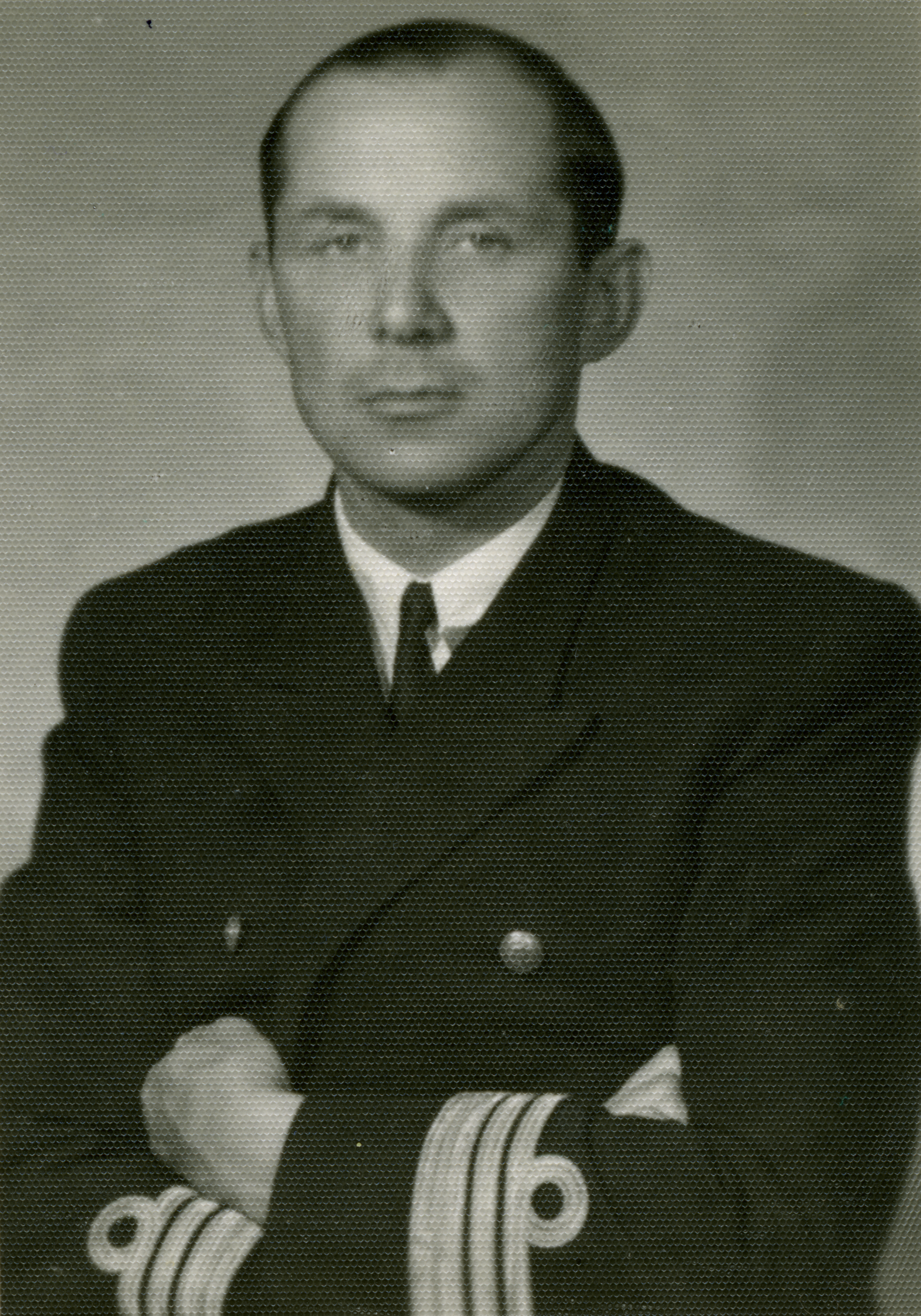
- Born: 22 September 1907; Giżewo
- Died: 16 December 1952 (aged 45); Warsaw
- Military career
- Allegiance: Poland
- Branch: Polish Navy
- Rank: Komandor porucznik (Commander)
- Unit: Heliodor Laskowski's Artillery Battery No. 31 (XXXI) in Coastal Artillery Division
- Conflicts: Battle of Hel (1939)
- Awards: Silver Cross of Virtuti Militari (30 October 1946)

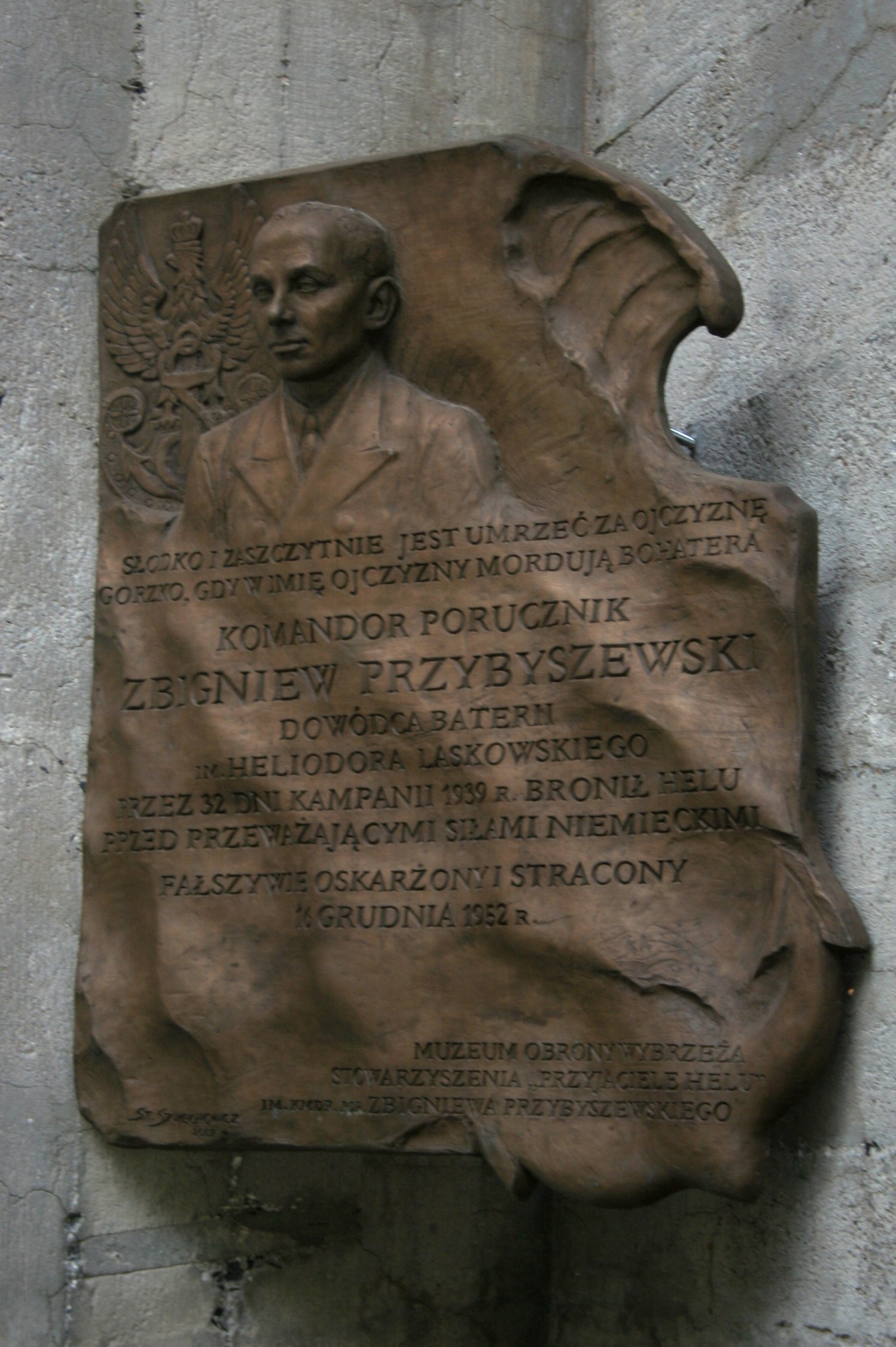
Zbigniew Przybyszewski plaque in Museum of Coastal Defence

Zbigniew Przybyszewski (1907–1952) was a Polish military officer and a Commander in the Polish Navy. During the early stages of World War II he served with distinction as the commanding officer of the Heliodor Laskowski's Artillery Battery No. 31 at Hel Peninsula. After the war he returned to Poland from a prisoner of war camp and resumed his service, rising to the post of CO Coastal Artillery and deputy commander of the Naval Branch of the General Staff. Arrested by Soviet authorities under false charges of espionage, he was sentenced to death in a show trial and executed.

== Biography ==
He took up his first official position in the Navy Staff in Świecie, where he became the commander of a training platoon. From 1931 to 1932 he was the watch officer of the torpedo boat ORP "Krakowiak". In the meantime, as an acting watch officer, he participated in the cruise of the destroyer ORP "Wicher" to Sweden. At the beginning of 1933 he was appointed deputy commander of ORP "Krakowiak", and at the end of the year he moved to the Fleet Staff in Gdynia as a company commander. In 1934 he became an artillery officer on the submarine ORP "Wilk". In the years 1935-1936 he was at the Maritime Yachting Training Centre, initially as deputy commander, and later as commander of the unit. In 1936 he became executive officer of the torpedo boat ORP "Mazur", and from 1937 he sailed as the first artillery officer on the destroyers: ORP "Burza" and ORP "Błyskawica".

At the end of 1938 he became commander of the headland battery no. 31 in the Coastal Artillery Division on Hel. During the Invasion of Poland in 1939 he led effective fire against the German training battleships "Schleswig-Holstein" and "Schlesien", scoring hits on September 25. On the same day he was injured as a result of shelling of the headland by German ships. In his absence the battery again accurately hit the battleships on September 27. On September 28 he returned to the frontline and took command of the unit, which retained operational capability until the end of the defense of the Polish coast.

After the capitulation of Hel on 2 October 1939 he was taken prisoner and for the rest of the war he was in oflags: XVIII B Spittal and II C Woldenberg. In Woldenberg he tried to escape twice by digging a tunnel under the fence and hiding in a truck. Unfortunately both attempts ended without success.

When liberation came in 1945, he decided to return to Poland and began working at the Sea Fishing Institute in Gdynia. In the same year he was accepted into the forming Navy and appointed commander of the 2nd company at the School of Naval Specialists. In early 1946, he was briefly adjutant to the commander of the Navy, and when the chaser division was formed, he took over its command. At the end of 1946 he became commander of the 31st coastal artillery division. In the years 1949–1950 he held the positions of head of the Naval Artillery Service and deputy head of the Naval Department of the General Staff of the Polish Armed Forces.

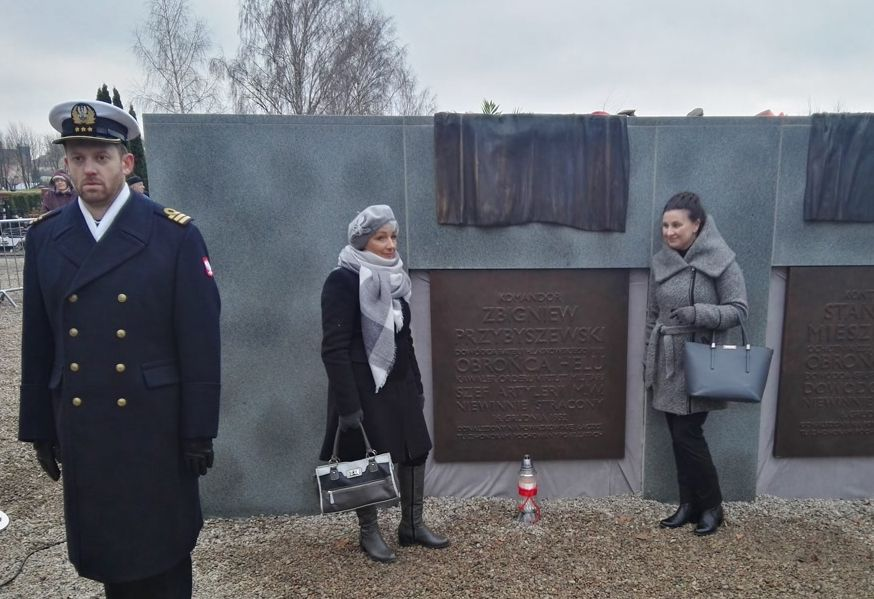
Grave of Zbigniew Przybyszewski located on the Polish Navy Cemetery in Gdynia

In 1950 he was unexpectedly arrested by the Main Directorate of Information of the Polish Army. On July 21, 1952, the Supreme Military Court in Warsaw issued a verdict in the case of "organizing a conspiracy in the army". On false charges of espionage, 7 Navy officers were sentenced to death or life imprisonment. In December 1952, 3 officers were shot in the back of the head in the prison in Warsaw's Mokotów district, including Zbigniew Przybyszewski who died on December 16. The body of Commander Przybyszewski was secretly buried by the officers from Ministry of Public Security. The remaining 4 convicted officers remained in prison until 1956. On 24 April 1956 the Supreme Military Court decided that the criminal proceedings should be resumed and after a retrial, the 1952 verdict was overturned, stating the total innocence of the convicted.

== Promotions ==
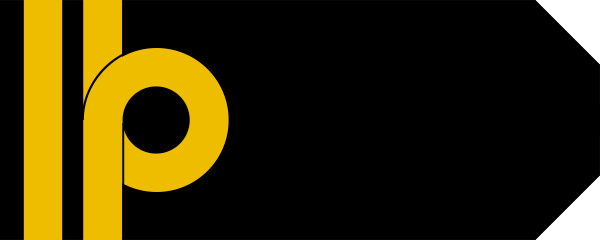
- Podporucznik marynarki (Ensign) - 1930
- - Porucznik marynarki (Lieutenant junior grade) - 1933
- - Kapitan marynarki (Lieutenant) - 1938
- - Komandor podporucznik (Lieutenant commander) - 1945
- - Komandor porucznik (Commander) - 1946
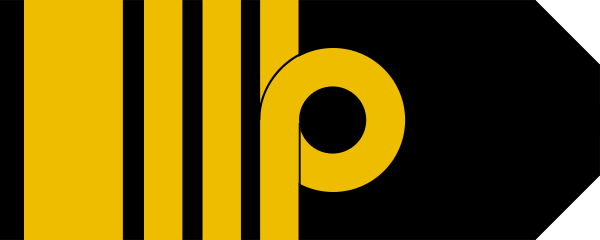
- - Komandor (Captain) - posthumously, 2015

== Awards and decorations ==
- Silver Cross of Virtuti Militari (30 October 1946)
- Order of the Cross of Grunwald, 3rd Class
- Officer's Cross of the Order of Polonia Restituta (posthumously, 2011)
- Medal For Participation in the Defensive War of 1939
- Medal for Oder, Neisse and Baltic
- Medal of Victory and Freedom 1945

== See also ==
- Coastal Artillery Division (Poland)]
- Heliodor Laskowski's Artillery Battery No. 31 (XXXI)

== Books and articles ==
- Krzysztof Zajączkowski, Bohater obrony Helu. Kmdr por. Zbigniew Przybyszewski. 1907–1952, Warszawa 2011 (ISBN 978-83-89568-95-3)
- Julian Czerwiński, Małgorzata Czerwińska, Maria Babnis, Alfons Jankowski, Jan Sawicki Kadry Morskie Rzeczypospolitej. Tom II. Polska Marynarka Wojenna. Część I. Korpus oficerów 1918–1947. Wyższa Szkoła Morska, Gdynia 1996 (ISBN 83-86703-50-4)
