= Coastal Artillery Division (Poland) =

- Dywizjon Artylerii Nadbrzeżnej
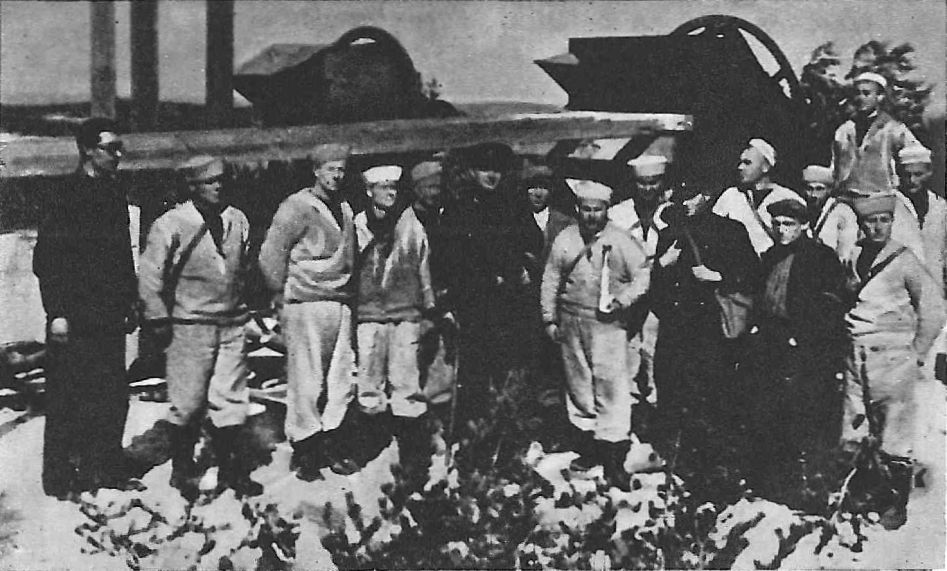
- Command and crew of battery No. 34 consisting of sailors from ORP Gryf, 1939
- Active: 1935–1939
- Allegiance: Second Polish Republic
- Branch: Polish Navy
- Type: Coastal artillery
- Garrison/HQ: Hel, Poland
- Engagements: World War II: Battle of Hel; Battle of Gdynia

Commanders
- Notable commanders: kmdr ppor. Stanisław Kukiełka

The Coastal Artillery Division (Polish: Dywizjon Artylerii Nadbrzeżnej) was a coastal artillery unit of the Polish Army in the Second Polish Republic stationed in the Hel Fortified Area. The division fought in defend Hel in 1939 during the Third Reich's invasion of Poland.

== Formation and organizational changes ==
Since 1933, there were plans to expand the previously existing coastal artillery company, which gathered the previously existing coastal artillery platoons. Due to the above, in the spring of 1935, the company was transformed into a cadre battery, to which the coastal artillery unit formed in Oksywie was incorporated to staff the future artillery battery No. 31. On June 25, 1935, by order of the Minister of Military Affairs L.dz.2621/Tj.org., the Coastal Artillery Division (DAN) was created. The organizational structure of the division was as follows:

- Division command (8 officers, 80 NCOs and privates, and 2 civilian employees),
- Artillery battery no. 1 (newly formed 152.4 mm caliber) (4 officers, 133 NCOs and privates),
- Artillery batteries no. 11 and 12 ("Danish" and "Greek" 105 mm guns) (1 officer, 37 NCOs and privates),
- Artillery battery no. 13 (Canet 100 mm gun) (1 officer, 43 NCOs and privates).

The organization of the division was to be completed by 1937. In 1936, by order of the Chief of the Navy Command, the battery numbering was changed: no. 1 to XXXI (headland), no. 11 to XXXII, no. 12 to XXXIII, and no. 13 to no. XI. Battery XXXI-XXXIII was stationed on the Hel Peninsula. Battery No. XI (Canet) was stationed at Oksywie and in 1938 was organizationally subordinated to the 1st Marine Anti-Aircraft Artillery Squadron in Gdynia. The organized batteries were given permanent positions (gun stations, ammunition shelters, ammunition supply was provided and camouflaged). Acquisition of facilities for barracks was undertaken.

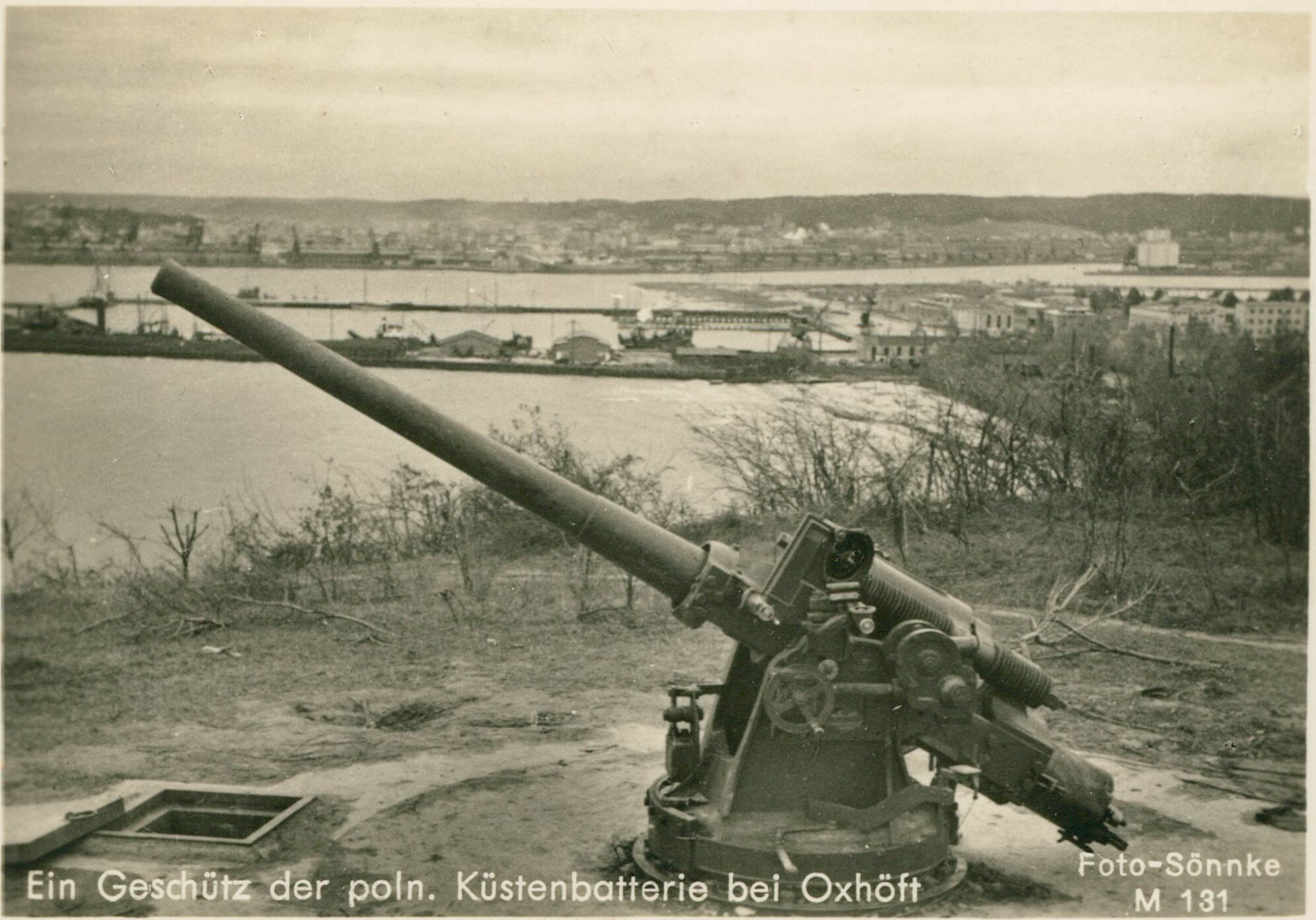
Artillery battery no. 13 (Canet 100 mm gun) in Gdynia, 1939

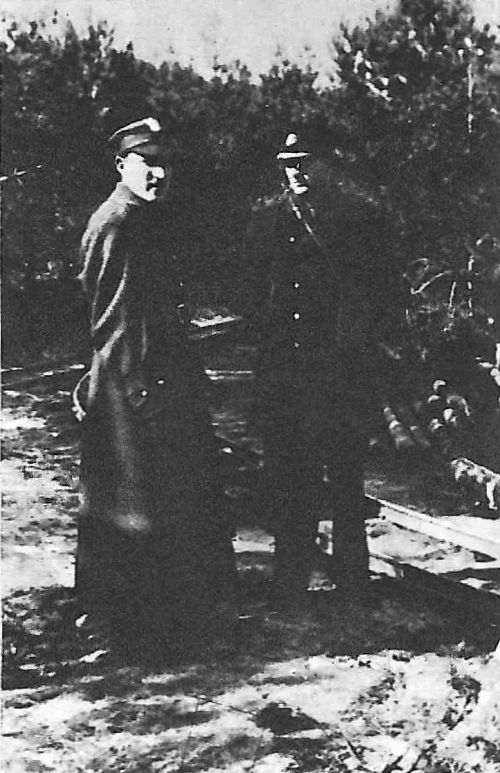
Commander of the Coastal Artillery Squadron, 2nd Lt. Commander Stanisław Kukiełka and Reserve 2nd Lt. Engineer Borowski, construction manager of Battery No. 34 in Hel in September 1939.

During the alarm mobilization in 1939 in the green group, the division additionally mobilized the following subunits in Hel:

- Division command,
- Heliodor Laskowski's Artillery Battery No. 31 (XXXI),
- battery no. XXXII,
- battery no. XXXIII,
- machine gun platoon (13,2 mm Hotchkiss machine guns),
- local communications platoon,
- guard company Hel Fortified Area ,
- command of Hel Fortified Area,
- square and security officer,
- Hel Military Port,
- mine pit,
- Hel Observation Point,
- Hel Radio Center,
- Hel Signal Center

in Jastarnia:

- Jastarnia Observation Point

in Władysławowo:

- Władysławowo Port Captain,

Due to the shortage of coastal artillery and the need to provide direct protection of the approaches to the ports in Jastarnia, Władysławowo and Hel, at the end of 1938 the organization of new batteries in Division was undertaken. The guns for the batteries being organized were in the warehouses of the Fleet and the Riverine Flotilla in Gdynia, Modlin and Pinsk. Their formation and placement were carried out from the beginning of 1939 until the outbreak of the war. On 16 May 1939, the head of Polish Navy applied to the Chief of the General Staff of the Polish Army to enter the created batteries into the mobilization tables, but to no avail. Anti-landing batteries were formed on naval bases wz. 1916 in prepared positions:

- No. 38 (XXXVIII) in Hel in the fishing port (2-1 75 mm guns model 1897),
- No. 39 (XXXIX) in the main land defense position of Hel (10 37 mm Hotchkiss guns model 1885),
- No. 40 (XL) eventually named No. 43 (XLIII)[3] in Władysławowo (2 75 mm guns model 1897),
- No. 41 (XLI) in Jastarnia (2 75 mm guns model 1897),
- No. 42 southeast of Jastarnia-Bor (2 75 mm guns model 1897),
- half-battery/illuminating platoon included in battery no. XXXI on its premises (2 75 mm guns mm wz. 1897).

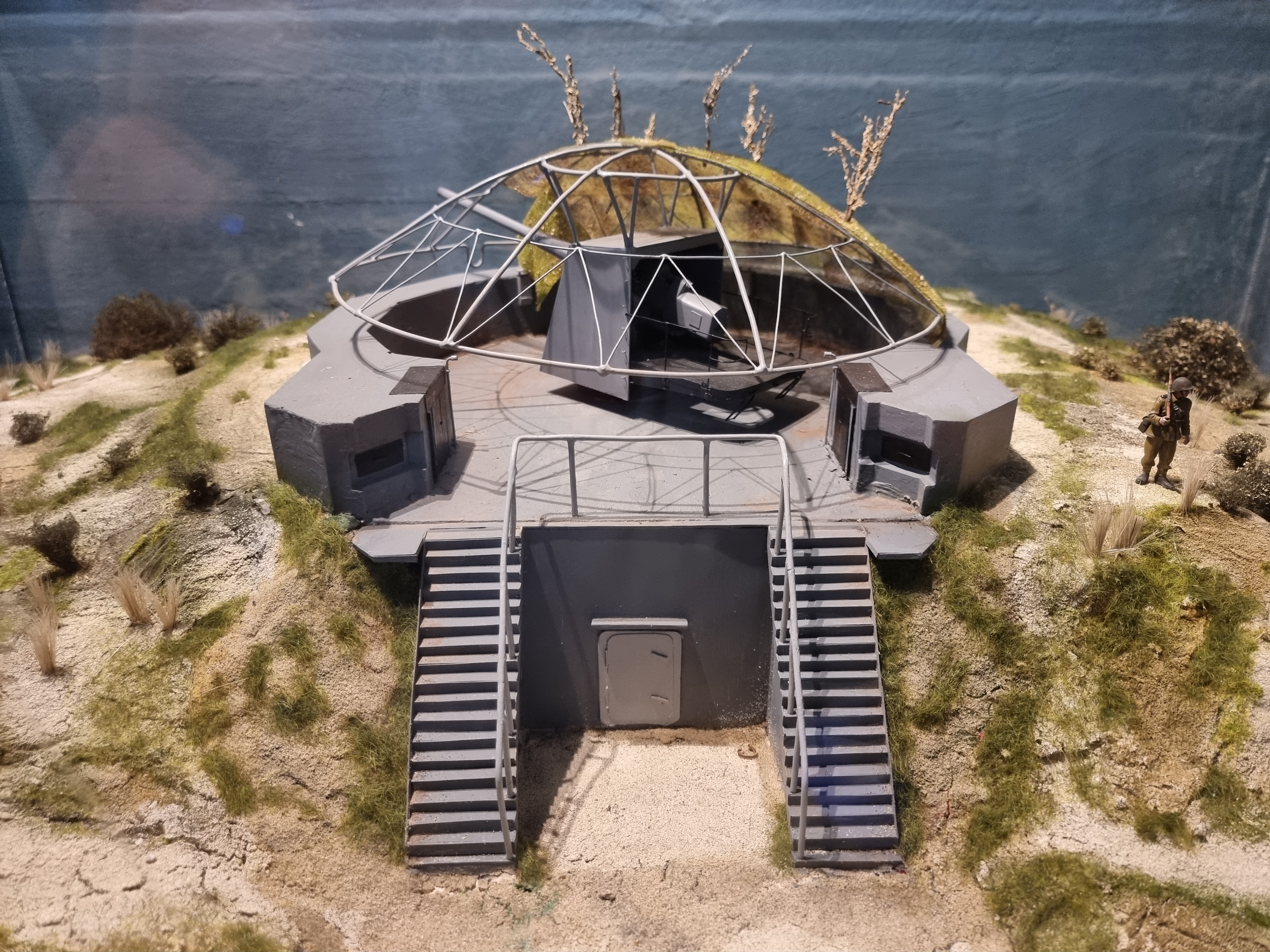
Heliodor Laskowski's Artillery Battery No. 31 (XXXI)

These batteries were mobilized on August 23, 1939, in the alarm mobilization.

After the outbreak of the war, in order to further strengthen the anti-landing defense, improvised batteries and platoons were formed from the Fleet personnel and artillery equipment obtained mainly from disarmed and sunken vessels of the Fleet:

- battery without a number (2 guns caliber 75 mm wz. 1897) from ORP "Czapla" and ORP "Żuraw" disarmed on September 2 in Jastarnia,
- platoon incorporated on September 2 into battery XI (2 guns caliber 47 mm wz. 1885) in Oksywie,
- battery no. 44 (2 guns caliber 75 mm wz. 1897) from ORP "Generał Haller" near the Hel observation point,
- battery without a number (2 guns caliber 75 mm wz. 1897) from ORP "Komendant Piłsudski" between the naval port and the fishing port in Hel.
- battery no. 34 (3 guns cal. 120 mm wz. 36 Bofors 1x1 and 1x2 and 2 nkm cal. 13.2 mm) from ORP "Gryf" built from 10 to 12 September, after transporting and installing the guns, the concrete was waited for to dry, the battery was launched (test shooting) on 30 September,
- artillery platoon (3 guns cal. 47 mm wz. 1885) set on 4–5 September on the breakwater of the Naval Port in Gdynia.
- reinforcement of the anti-aircraft defense of battery no. XXXI: 1x2 gun cal. 40 mm anti-aircraft. Bofors wz. 36, 3 nkm 2x13.2 mm wz. 30 from ORP Gryf
