= Heliodor Laskowski's Artillery Battery No. 31 =

Four-gun coastal artillery battery

- Bateria artylerii nr 31 (XXXI) im. Heliodora Laskowskiego
- Hel Fortified Area
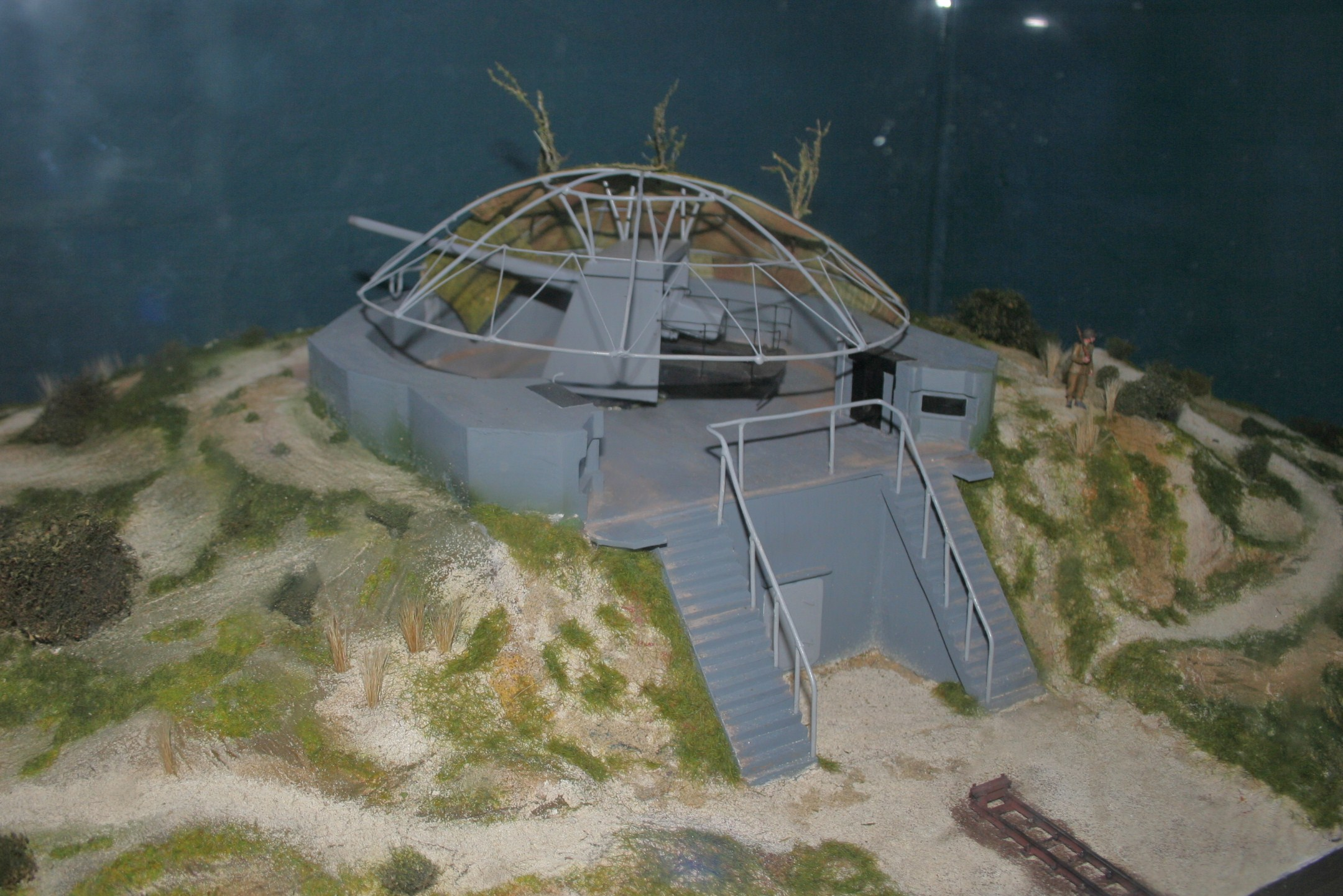
- A model of site no. 4 from the Coastal Defense Museum

Site information
- Type: Coastal artillery
- Owner: Poland
- Open to the public: Yes
- Condition: Museum

Location
- Coordinates: 54°35′44″N 18°48′43″E

Site history
- Built: 1934–1935
- Built by: Polish Navy
- In use: 1935-1939 (Second Polish Republic); 1939-1945 (Third Reich); 1947-1977(Polish People's Republic)
- Materials: Reinforced concrete
- Battles/wars: Battle of Hel (1939); East Pomeranian offensive (1945)
- Events: World War II; Cold War

Garrison information
- Past commanders: Capitan Zbigniew Przybyszewski (1938-1939)
- Garrison: 2 officers and 160 sailors

The Heliodor Laskowski's Artillery Battery No. 31 (XXXI) was a four-gun coastal artillery battery, positioned on the headland of the Hel Peninsula, also called the "headland battery". It was part of the Coastal Artillery Division, Hel Fortified Area. During invasion of Poland in 1939 it was a very important element of the Polish defense of the Coast.

The battery consisted of four exposed reinforced concrete positions, armed with 152.4 mm Bofors guns, equipped with armor masks, exposed from the rear. The gun positions were placed in the forest and camouflaged with nets. On the lower level of the positions, under the guns, there was a magazine with a supply of ammunition.

== Planning and design ==
The "Helska", "Cyplowa" battery was formed on the basis of the order of the Chief of the General Staff of the Polish Army No. 370/IIIF, i.e. from 26 February 1934, and the order of the Chief of the Navy Command No. 562/34, i.e. from 27 February 1934. Talks on the purchase of four medium-caliber coastal artillery guns began at the beginning of 1933. On the initiative of 2nd Lt. Cmdr. Heliodor Laskowski, head of the Artillery Command and Armament Service of the Navy Command, the Swedish company Bofors was invited to the tender. The first contract with Bofors was signed on 20 December 1933 for the delivery of four 152.4 mm wz. 35 guns for the new coastal battery in Hel. Direct supervision of the range tests in Sweden and the subsequent assembly of the guns in Hel was exercised on behalf of the Navy by Warrant Officer Jan Lichy. In June 1935, the first batch of the delivery was loaded onto the Polish military transport ship ORP Wilia and transported to Gdynia. From there, the guns were transported to Hel by rail. The second batch reached its destination in September in the same way. The formation of the battery staff began in May 1935 in Oksywie, and its commander was Lieutenant Mar. Władysław Trzciński. In June 1935, the unit was given the name "Coastal Artillery Unit", in July it was transferred to Hel and became part of the Coastal Artillery Cadre Battery, reorganized from the Coastal Artillery Company of the Navy. The unit consisted of 1 officer, 6 non-commissioned officers and 57 sailors. The unit took part in assembling the guns on their stations. By order of the Minister of Military Affairs on June 26, 1935, it was given the name "1st Coastal Artillery Squadron Battery". Shortly afterwards, in 1936, its name was changed to XXXI Battery. After the premature death of the initiator, 2nd Lt. Commander Heliodor Laskowski, on January 1, 1937, the battery was named after him. There were plans to build a second such battery (four 152.4 mm Bofors guns) on the Hel Peninsula, but the project was not implemented until the outbreak of the war. Ultimately, in 1939 the battery had 2 officers and 160 non-commissioned officers and sailors on peacetime staff.

== Specifications ==
General characteristics 152,4 mm Bofors wz. 35 gun

- Caliber: 152.4 mm
- Ammunition: 152.4 × 1250R
- Barrel length: 55 calibers
- Shell weight: 47 kg (armor-piercing and high-explosive)
- Initial velocity: 920 m/s
- Range: 22,400 or 26,000 m
- Angles of fire:
  - Vertical: −8° to +47°
  - Horizontal: 360°
- Gun weight: 10,500 kg
- Armor penetration: 78 mm at 15 km
- Rate of fire: 6 rds/min
- Number of guns on XXXI battery: 4

== World War II ==
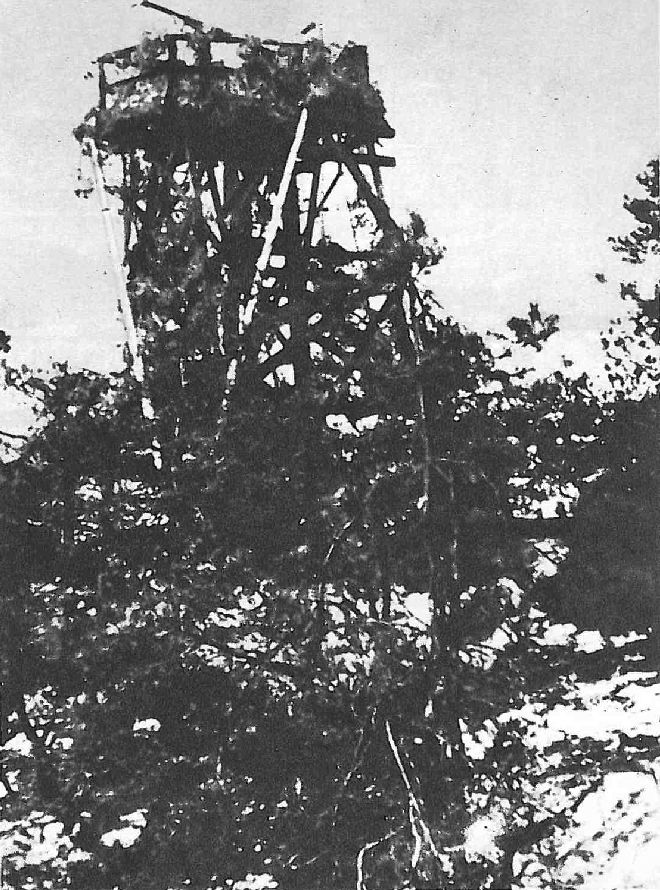
Camouflaged fire control tower in 1939

XXXI Battery was mobilized during the alarm mobilization in the green group within 24 hours by the Coastal Artillery Division. During the war, the battery was commanded by Captain Zbigniew Przybyszewski, and during his short stay in hospital (wounded), this function was performed by Captain Bohdan Mańkowski. XXXI Battery reached a strength of 4 officers and 230 non-commissioned officers and sailors. Armament: 4 wz. 35 guns cal. 152.4 mm, 2 wz. 1897 guns cal. 75 mm on wz. 1916 naval bases, 1 wz. 30 2 × 13.2 mm heavy machine gun, 4 wz. 30 heavy machine guns and 4 light machine guns. Additionally, after 3 September, the anti-aircraft defence battery from the sunken ORP "Gryf" was included in the following: 1 wz. 35 anti-aircraft gun 2 × 40 mm, 3 nkm wz. 30 2 × 13.2 mm.

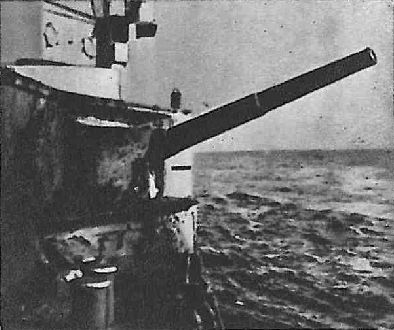
Damage to the casemate of the 150 mm gun of the battleship Schleswig-Holstein, sustained on 27 September 1939 during a fight with the Heliodor Laskowski's battery

On September 1 at approx. 14:00 the battery was attacked by 25–28 Ju-87 bombers, the battery's heavy machine guns took up the fight, the following were damaged: one 75 mm gun, the guardhouse and telephone lines, the makeshift shelter for 75 mm ammunition was destroyed. 5 sailors were wounded, 3 of them seriously. On September 2 at 18:15 the battery area was bombed by 6 planes, from 18:00 At 20:00 and throughout the night of 2/3 September the battery area was bombarded by harassing raids by German seaplanes every 15–20 minutes, as a result of which the rangefinder altimeter was damaged, power cables were severed and the foundations of gun no. 4 were exposed. All damage was repaired and its previous condition restored. The battery took part in the morning artillery battle on 3 September 1939 with two German destroyers, “Leberecht Maass” and “Wolfgang Zenker”, and then at 10:00 it fired at the destroyer “Fredrich Eckoldt”. Between 4 and 10 September the battery area was the object of several raids by German aircraft, according to Polish sources the crew of gun no. 2 shot down a German aircraft on 4 September. On 11 September at At 14:30, the battleship "Schleswig-Holstein" standing in the Westerplatte ammunition basin shelled the battery area with 15 shells. That day, she supported the Land Coastal Defense units together with the minelayers ORP Czajka, ORP Jaskółka, ORP Rybitwa shelling German units; the 32nd Grenzwache Regiment in Reda and the SS "Heimwehr Danzig" in Mostowe Błot, during the support of Polish army, 58 shells were fired. According to Polish sources, on September 18 at approx. 17:00, the battleship "Schleswig-Holstein" was supposed to shell the battery area, damaging the power cable, shrapnel penetrated the walls of the artillery headquarters. On September 19 from 10:05, the battleship "Schleswig-Holstein" shelled, among others, the battery area with 35 salvos. One of the 280 mm shells exploded on the platform of gun no. 1, causing damage to the gun mask and breastwork, the masking of the position was torn off, telephone cables and the power supply for the geodetic rangefinder were severed. On September 21, the battleship "Schleswig-Holstein", again moored in Gdańsk, shelled the peninsula, including the battery area, with 6 shells, severing the power cable and the power supply for the geodetic rangefinder. On September 23, at about 10:00, the battleships "Schleswig-Holstein" and "Schlesien" shelled the entire peninsula, including the area of battery XXXI, and damaged the narrow-gauge railway tracks, the road and the spare rangefinder. On September 24, from 9:06, as on the previous day, the battleships shelled the peninsula and the "Helska" battery, without effect. The battery fought a double artillery duel with the German training battleships "Schleswig-Holstein" and "Schlesien". The first took place on September 25, the battery's salvos gained coverage and forced the battleships to retreat under the cover of a smoke screen. A double hit on gun no. 3 put them out of action and a hit on gun no. 1 also immobilized it. The artillery rangefinder was damaged, 2 sailors died, 10 were wounded, including 5 seriously. Captain Przybyszewski was also wounded. The battleships fired 130 280 mm shells and 123 150 mm shells, and the "headland" battery over 200. The second duel took place on September 27, ending with one hit on the casemate armor of the starboard 150 mm gun and wounding 7 crew members. The battery's fire control tower, its tilt and the power cables leading to it were damaged. 30 shells were fired from the battery. Thanks to good camouflage, the battery did not suffer any major damage during the campaign, despite air raids and battleship fire. Repair work was carried out on the battery until 30 September, and a report from the ammunition depot stated that the ammunition for the 152.4 mm guns was running out (it had enough for 15 minutes of continuous fire). On 1 October, the decision was made to capitulate and after the ceasefire, partial destruction of the rangefinders and transmitters was undertaken. On 2 October, the battery, together with the garrison of Hel, capitulated.

List of duels of Heliodor Laskowski's Artillery Battery No. 31 with German ships in 1939:

- 3 IX hrs. 6:53–7:05 shelling of destroyers "Leberecht Maass" and "Wolfgang Zenker" fighting with ORP "Gryf" and ORP Wicher", the battery fired 28 shells (7 salvos) at the destroyers, both ships withdrew under the cover of a smoke screen,
- 3 September at 11:32 the battery opened fire again at destroyer "Fredrich Eckoldt" sailing to the surveillance line, firing 10 shells obtaining coverage, the unit withdrew under the cover of a smoke screen,
- 6 September 15:03 shelling by 75 mm "illuminating" guns together with 43rd battery of 1. R. Flotille (1st Minesweeper Flotilla),
- 7 September 9:10–9:30 shelling by 75 mm "illuminating" guns together with XXXII battery of the 5th H.S.-Flotille (5th Port Protection Flotilla),
- 14 September 8:30 a.m. shelling by 75 mm "illuminating" guns together with the 44th battery of the M-132 minesweeper,
- 19 September the entire morning shelling was carried out together with the XIth battery, a group of units trawling and shelling the defense on Kępa Oksywska: M 3, "Nettelbeck", "Fuchs", S.V.K. Verband (6 ships), 1st Minesweeping Cutter Flotilla (5 ships),
- 19 September 15:05–15:15 shelling was carried out together with the XIth battery, a group of units trawling and shelling the defense on Kępa Oksywska: M 132, "Arkona", "Drache", "Otto Braun",
- 25 September 9:22–10:45 the battleships "Schlesien", "Schleswig-Holstein" were fired upon,
- 27 September 12:05–13:14 the battleships "Schlesien", "Schleswig-Holstein" were fired upon, the latter being hit.

In 1940, the German Kriegsmarine restored the guns of the Laskowski battery to working order, bringing in the missing gun equipment and ammunition. The battery was reintegrated into the coastal defense system as Marineartillerieabteilung 119 (MMA 119), also known as the Schlesien battery. It was used until the capitulation of the German forces on the Hel Peninsula on May 9, 1945.

== After 1945 ==
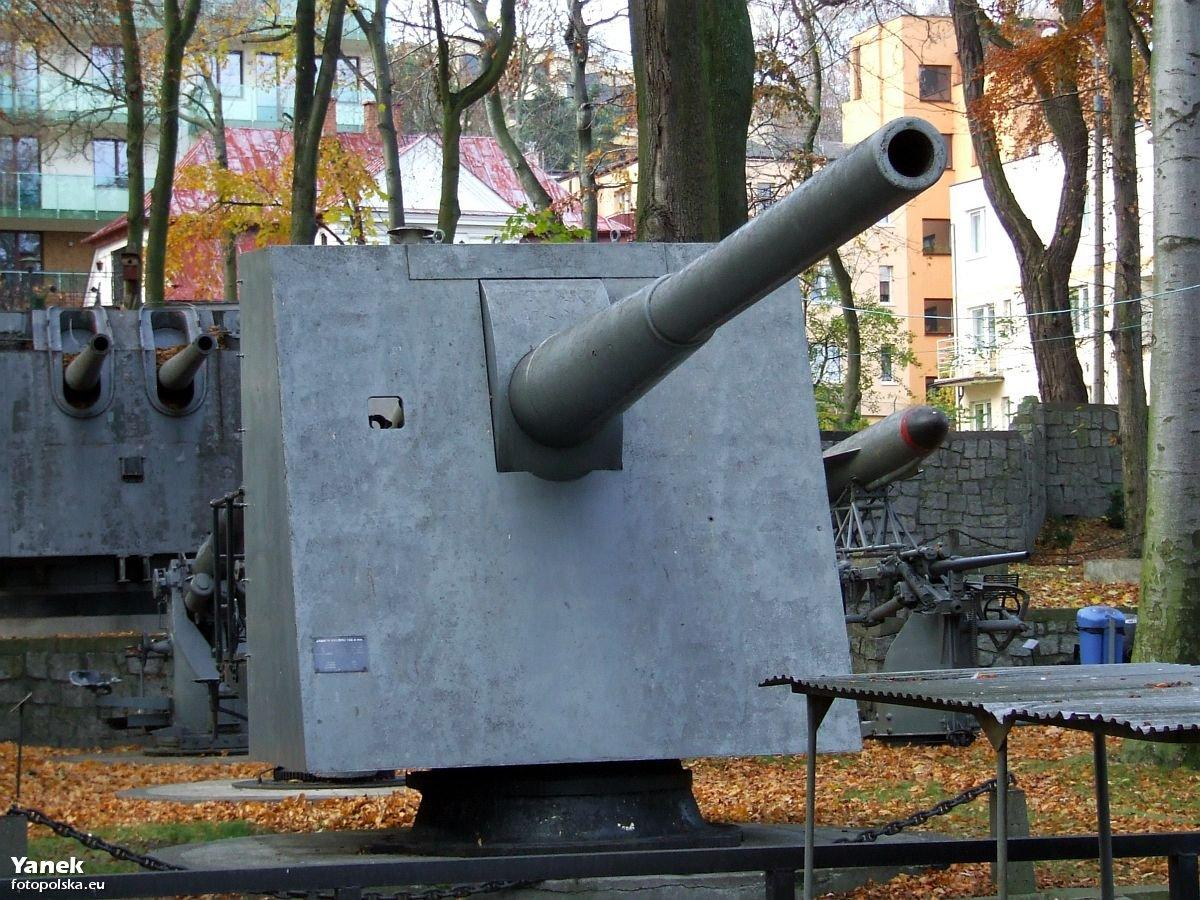
152 mm gun at the Navy Museum in Gdynia

After World War II, based on the gun positions of the former 31st Battery, the 2nd Battery of the 13th Independent Coastal Artillery Squadron was organized in 1946. The first commander of the Squadron was the pre-war battery commander – 2nd Lt. Commander Zbigniew Przybyszewski, who was soon removed, imprisoned and executed in 1952 as part of the Stalinist repressions as a result of the so-called commanders' conspiracy. In the period 1948–1949, an additional firing position was built, and the 152 mm Bofors guns were replaced with Soviet B-13 guns of caliber 130 mm (which required the reconstruction of the positions, including raising the floor by laying a 40 cm layer of concrete mix). In 1950, the squadron was disbanded, and in its place the Permanent Artillery Battery (BAS) was created and given the name 13 BAS. This battery operated until 1976, when coastal artillery was finally abandoned in Poland.

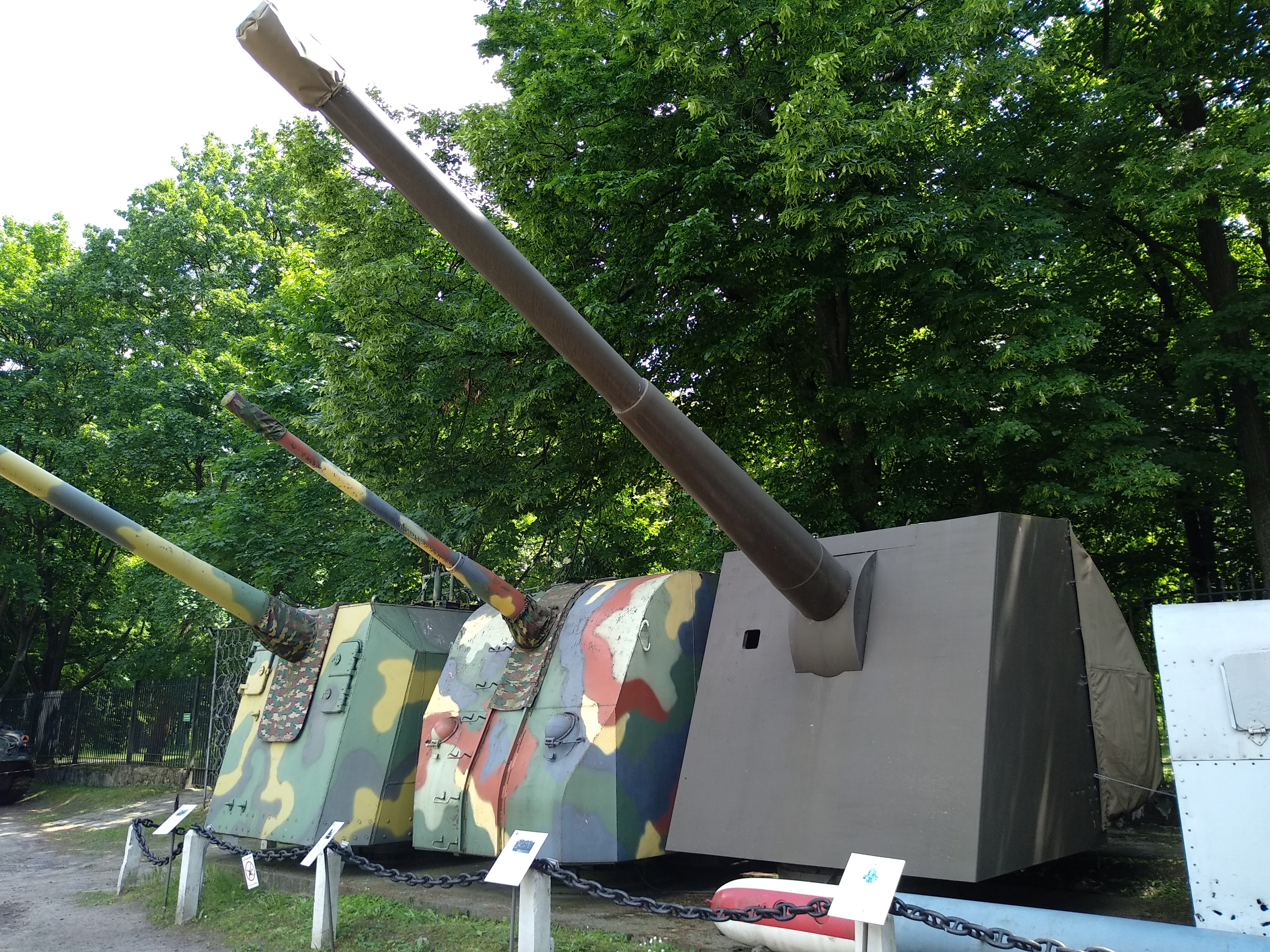
The first from the right is a 152 mm Bofors gun, model 1935, from the Heliodor Laskowski battery in Hel, exhibited at the Polish Army Museum in Warsaw

The rebuilt battery positions, located in the military area in Hel, as well as two original 152 mm guns, have survived. One of the guns is located in the Navy Museum in Gdynia (open-air exhibition), and the other in the Polish Army Museum in Warsaw.

In May 2008, thanks to the efforts of the Coastal Defense Museum in Hel, position no. 4 of the Laskowski Battalion was restored and opened to the public, along with the post-war B-13 gun preserved there and a gallery located in the basement of the position.

Since 2014, historical reenactments have been held annually on the anniversary of the capitulation of the Hel garrison in 1939 at the Heliodor Laskowski's battery. A group of local reenactors in the uniforms of the pre-war Polish Navy reenact a fire duel with German ships and the history of the 1939 war campaign.

== Commanders ==
=== Battery Commanders ===
- Lt. Władysław Trzciński (May 1935 – June 26, 1935)
- Capt. Stanisław Kukiełka (June 26, 1935 – April 8, 1937)
- Capt. Bohdan Mańkowski (April 9, 1937 – October 24, 1938)
- Capt. Zbigniew Przybyszewski (October 25, 1938 – October 2, 1939)
- Capt. Bohdan Mańkowski (acting September 25–28, 1939)

=== Deputy Battery Commanders ===
- Lt. Franciszek Pitułko (until July 1936)
- Warrant Officer Stanisław Brychcy (acting July 1936 – September 1, 1936)
- Lt. Bohdan Mańkowski (1 September 1936 – 8 April 1937)
- 2nd Lt. Zbigniew Deżakowski (acting from 1 November 1938)
- 2nd Lt. Kazimierz Hess (16 January – 27 May 1939)
- 2nd Lt. Bolesław Chrostowski (24 August – 2 October 1939)

== Gallery ==
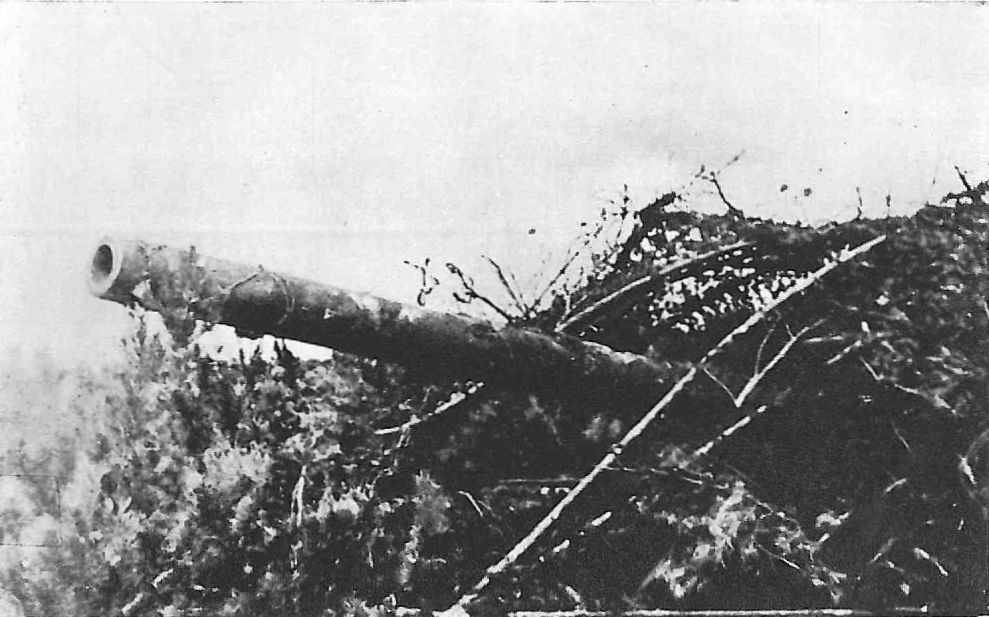
Heliodor Laskowski's battery in 1939

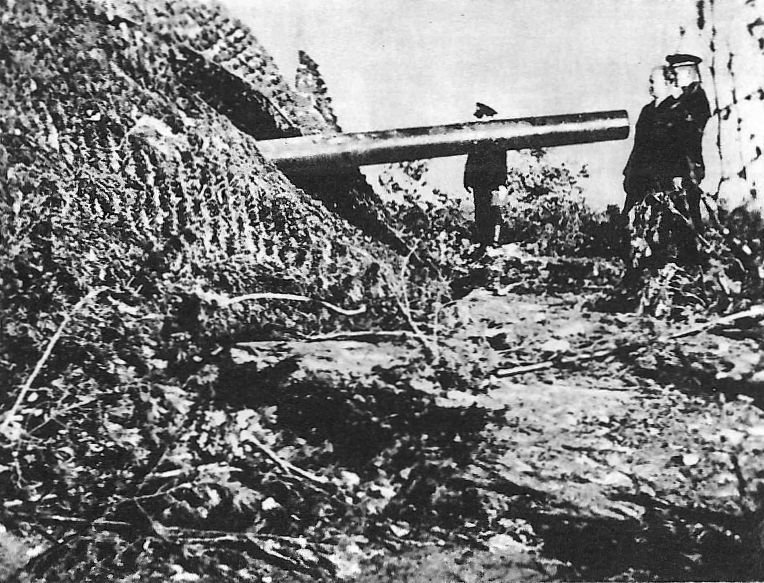
A camouflaged 152.4 mm Bofors gun position of the Heliodor Laskowski's battery in Hel, viewed by the Germans, 1939

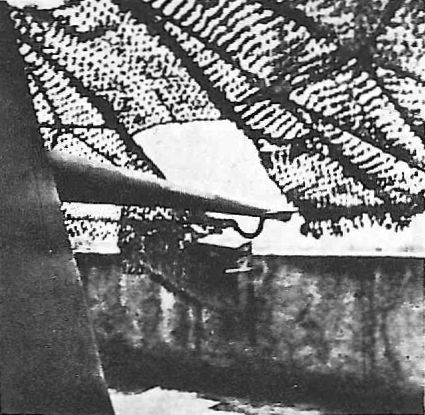
The interior of the combat position under the camouflage net, 1939

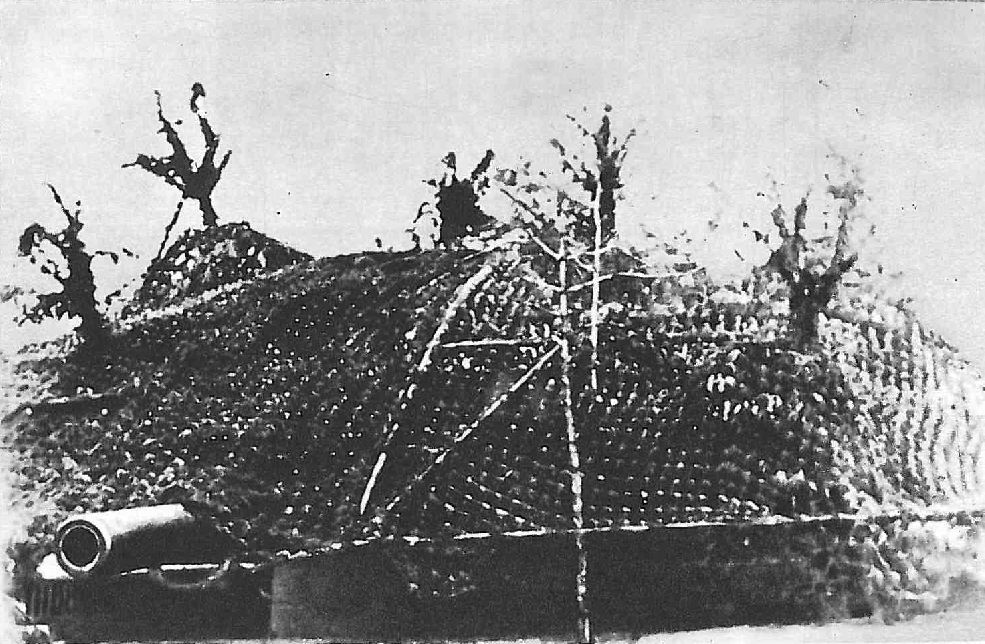
Camouflage netting spread over the gun, 1939

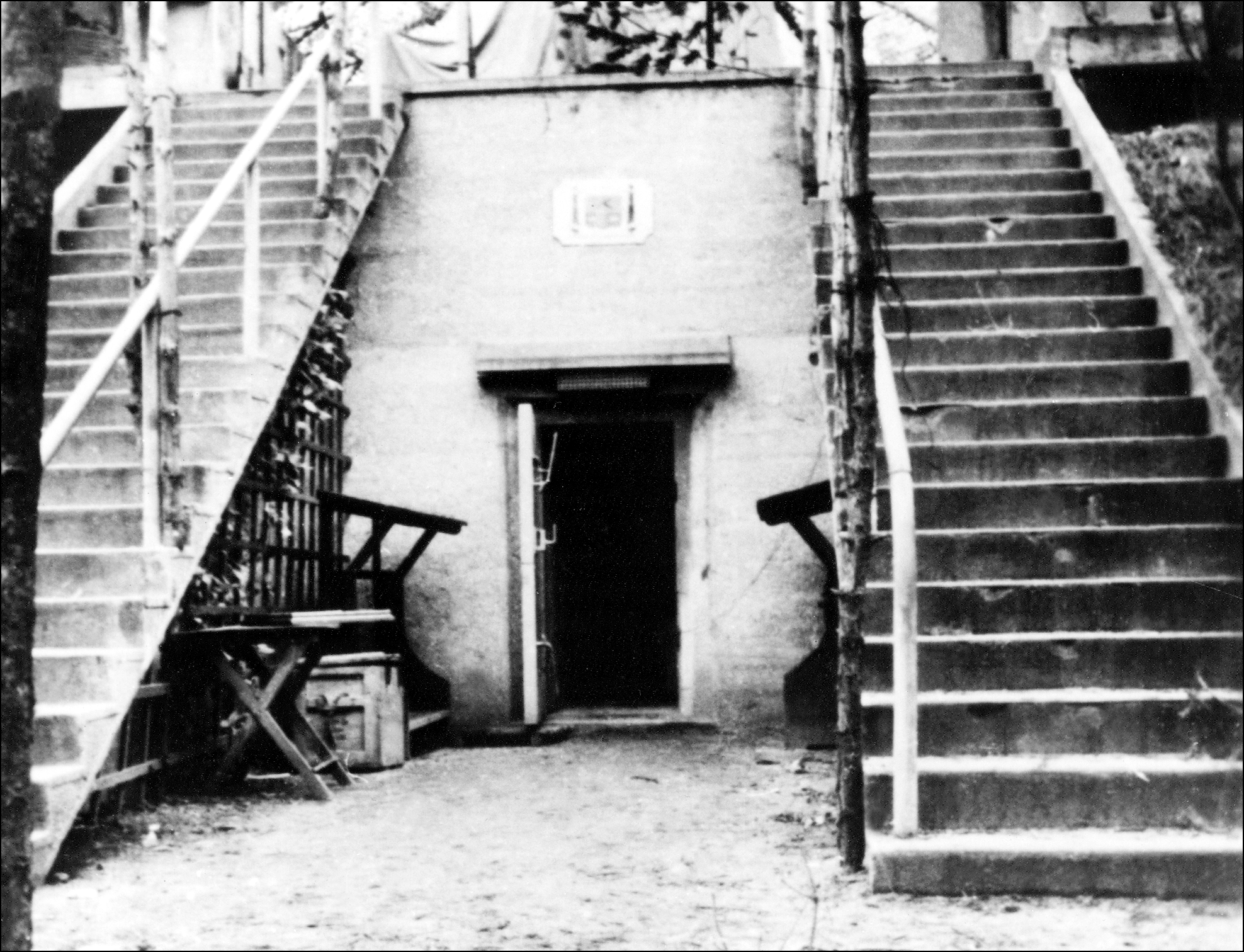
A shelter located under the gun position and stairs for the crew, 1939

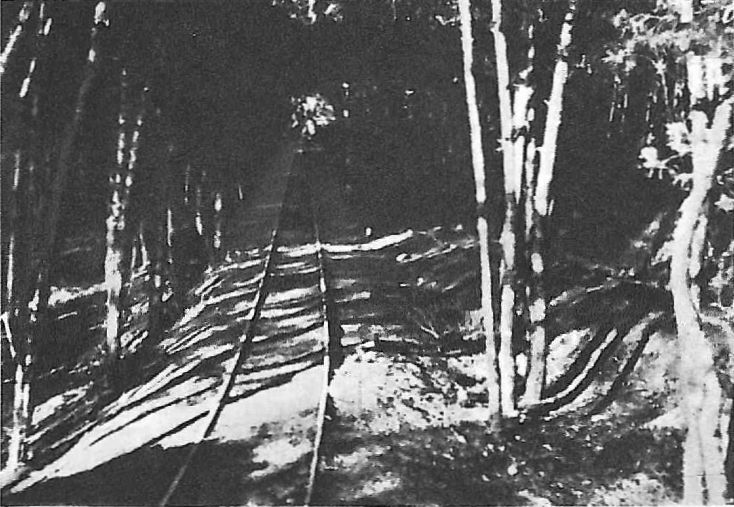
The narrow-gauge railway track that supplied the entire Hel Fortified Area, 1939

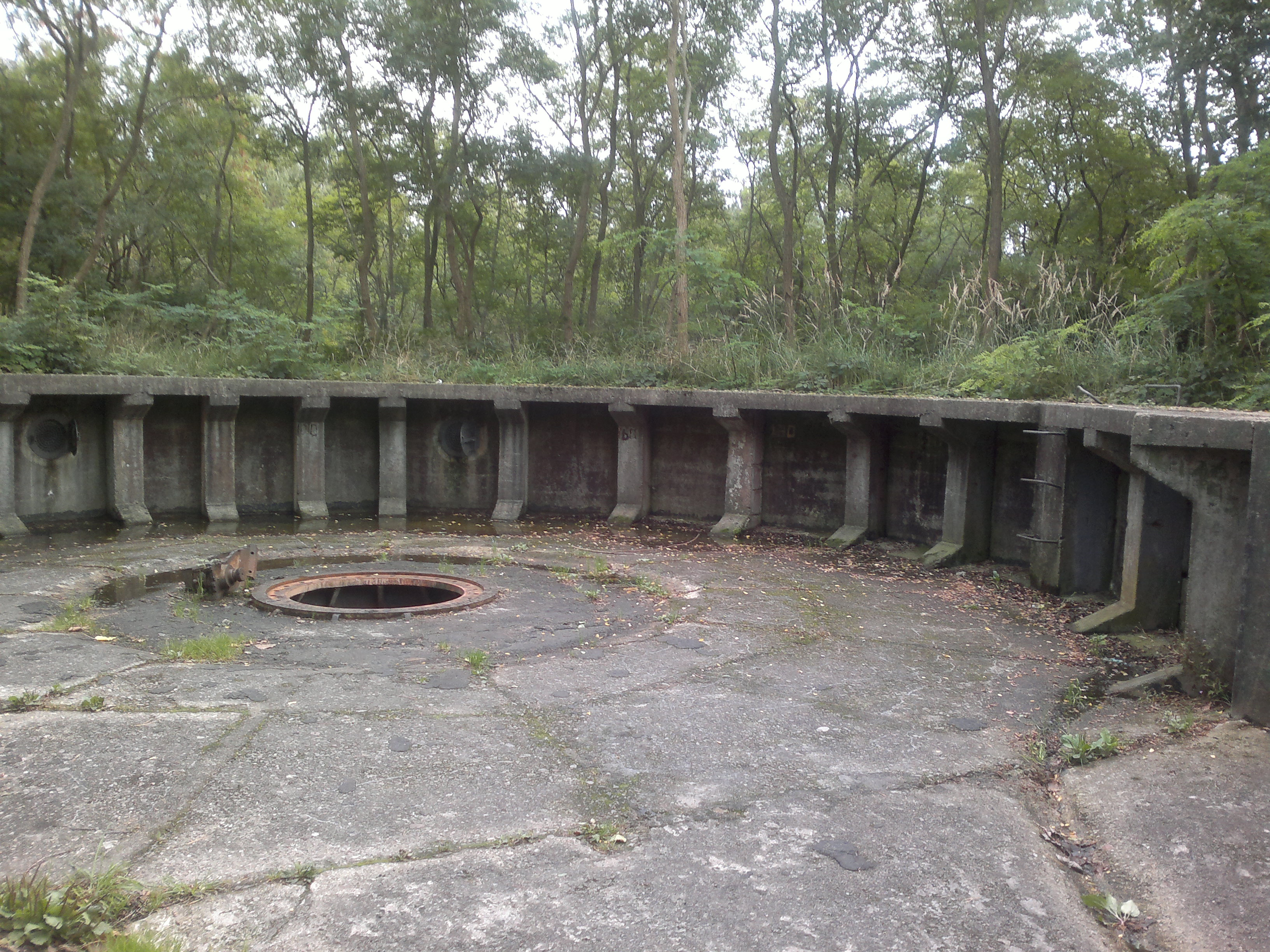
Remains of a 152.4 mm Bofors gun mount

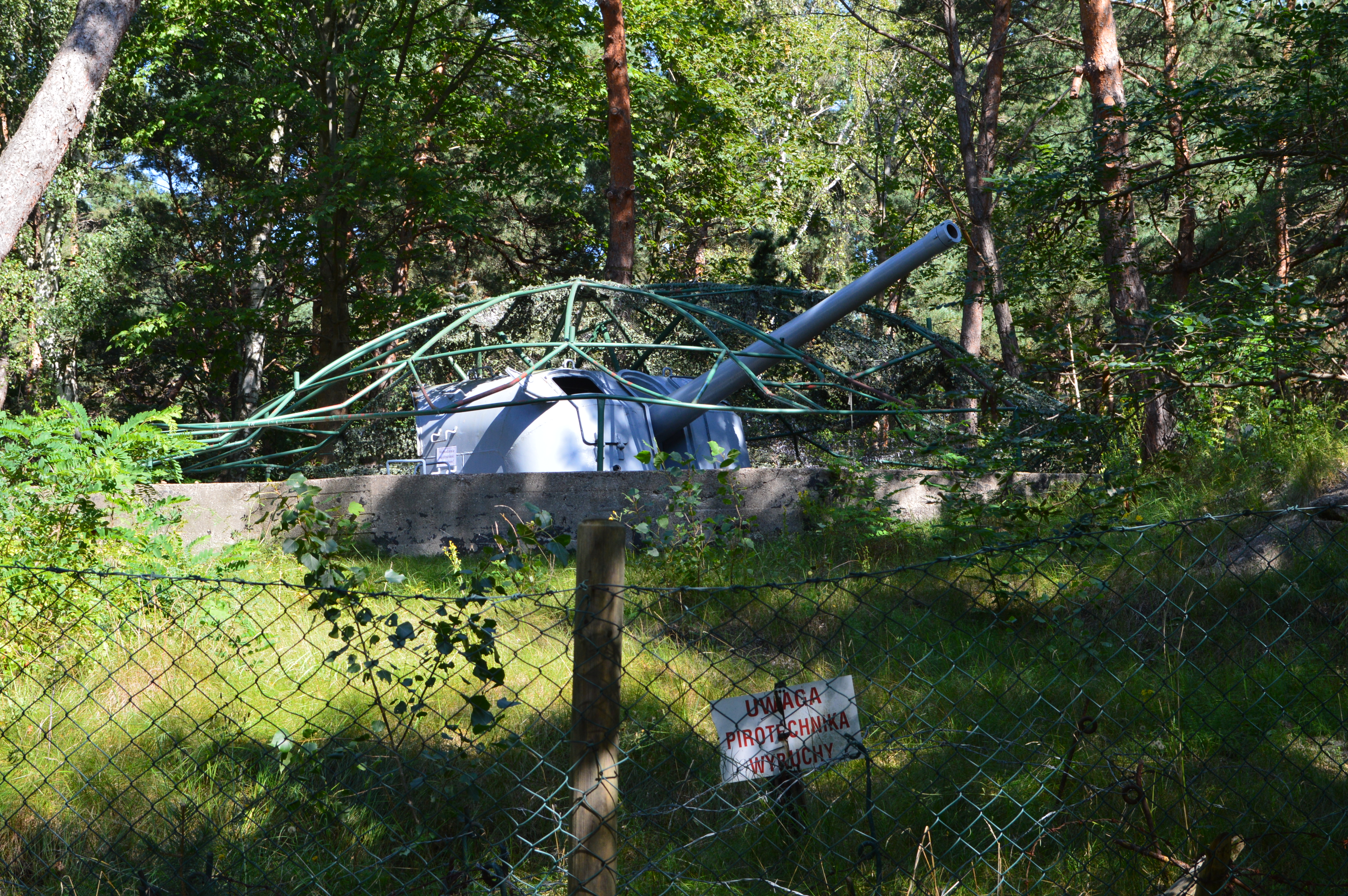
Gun stand no. 4 with the post-war B-13 gun, 2023

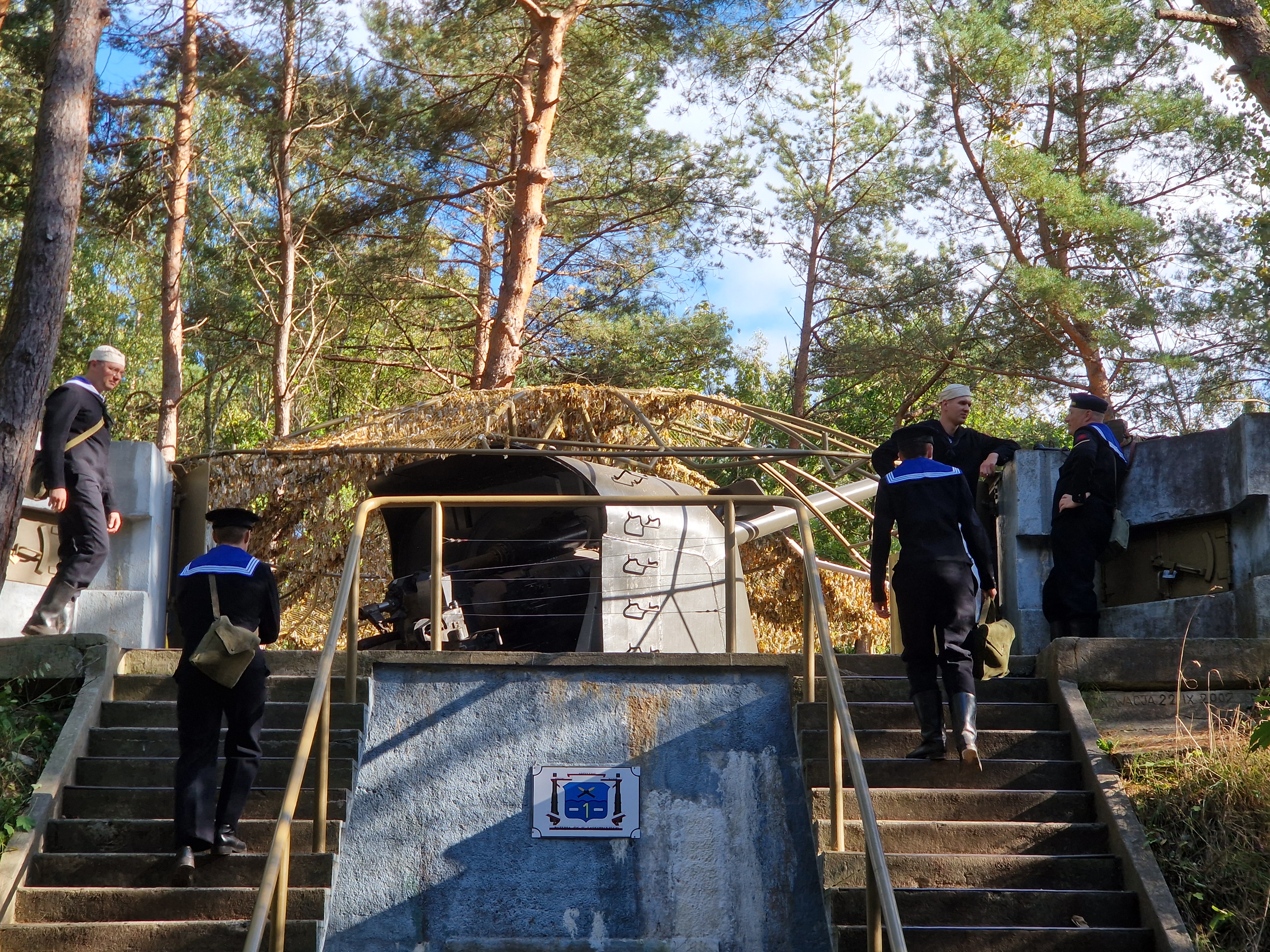
The B-13 gun was repainted in camouflage color in 2024

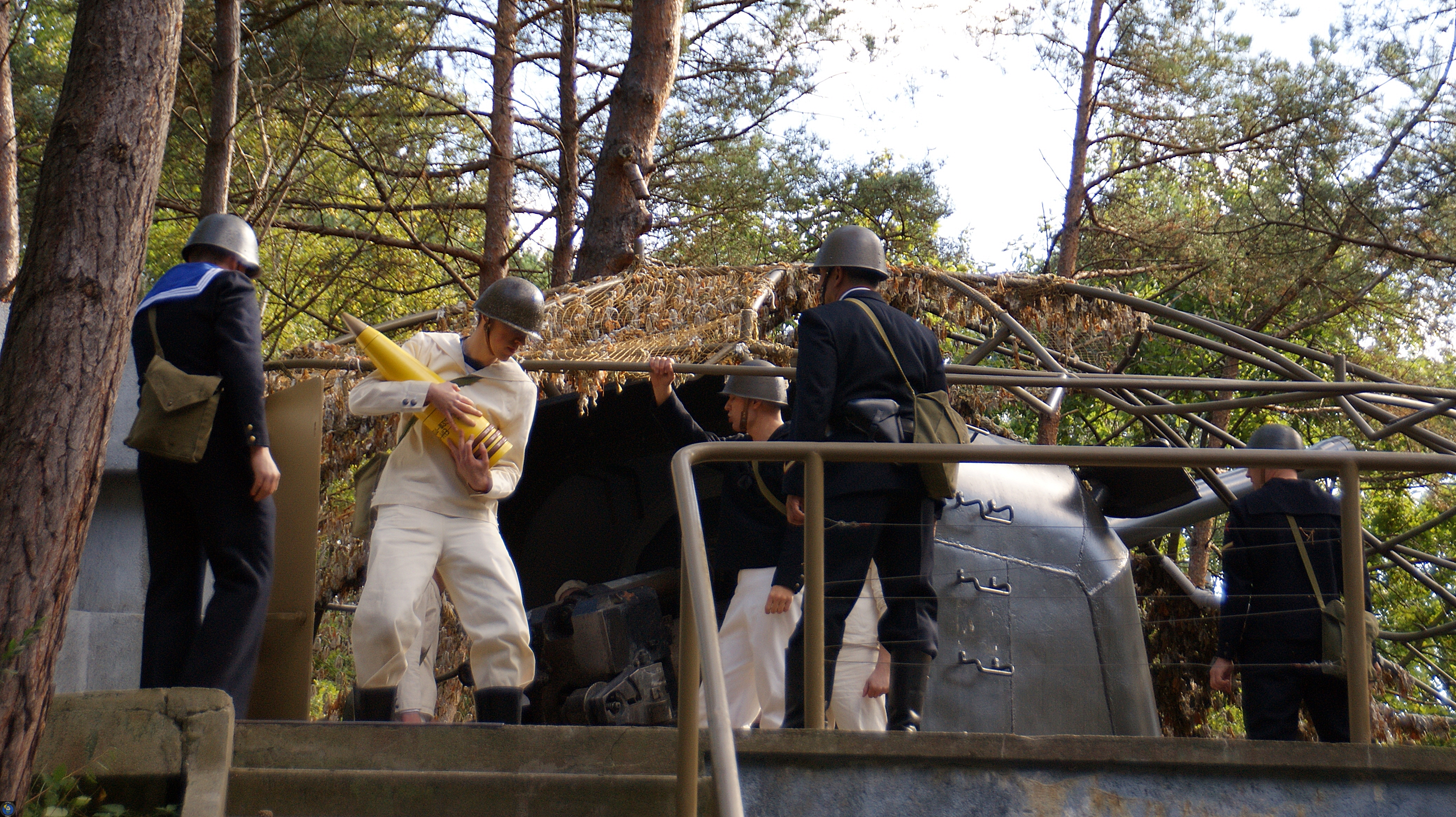
Reenactors from the Coastal Defense Group during a reenactment of gun operation, September 2024

== See also ==
- Hel Fortified Area
- Coastal Artillery Division (Poland)
- Invasion of Poland in 1939
- Westerplatte
