= Jastarnia Defensive Line =

Polish defensive line stretching across the Hel Peninsula

The Jastarnia Defensive Line is a Polish defensive group located at the narrowest point of the Hel Peninsula in northern Poland. The fortifications are located two kilometers (1.2 mi) west of the village of the same name. The defensive line spans the entire Hel Peninsula at its most narrow point, which is only 450 meters (490 yd) wide. While most of the fortifications of the line are four bunkers, there were also smaller anti-tank positions, as well as minefields, barbed wire, and anti-tank rails. The bunkers were all connected by a series of trenches that gradually became more elaborate as the war dragged on. Work on building the bunkers began in May 1939, and was set to be completed in October 1939, which is why most bunkers of the line are incomplete. The foundations of three small shelters remain unfinished because the war interrupted their building. Each bunker was equipped with enough supplies to last two weeks under siege.

The defenders of the Hel Peninsula surrendered on October 1, 1939, before the war reached the Jastarnia Line, which is why it is so well preserved. After the Polish surrendered, the bunkers were still garrisoned due to the U-boat base at Hel, and the Sokol Bunker was used as an observation post. As Soviet forces advanced through the region, the bunkers were once again garrisoned for combat. The Germans finally surrendered on May 10, 1945, two days after the German surrender at Reims. The town of Hel was the last part of Polish soil to be liberated from German troops.

The Sabala Bunker's armored machine gun dome.

At the end of the 1970s, Polish authorities retired the fortifications of the Jastarnia Line after 30 years of service. On June 15, 1999, the Provincial Conservator of Monuments declared the fortifications of the Jastarnia Line a monument, which is why you can visit them today.

== Fortifications ==
=== Sep Bunker ===
The Sep Bunker stands watch over the same beach today, but it is now part of a public park.

The Sep heavy infantry bunker is located on the seaward side of the peninsula, and is right on the beach. The bunker was tasked with blocking an amphibious landing, and a heavy machine gun in a casemate accomplished this task. On the ceiling was an armored dome that was equipped with a heavy machine gun with all-around fire. The bunker was supposed to be equipped with a 37 mm anti-tank gun mounted in an armored dome, but this was not added when war broke out in September 1939. The bunker was also armed with a 37 mm anti-tank gun mounted in a casemate facing the sea. The bunker had 130-centimeter (51 in) thick concrete walls and a 140 cm (55 in) thick roof. The bunker was never tested in combat, because the frontline was a few kilometres to the west when the Polish defenders surrendered on October 1, 1939.

=== Sabala Bunker ===
The Sabala Bunker as seen from head on.

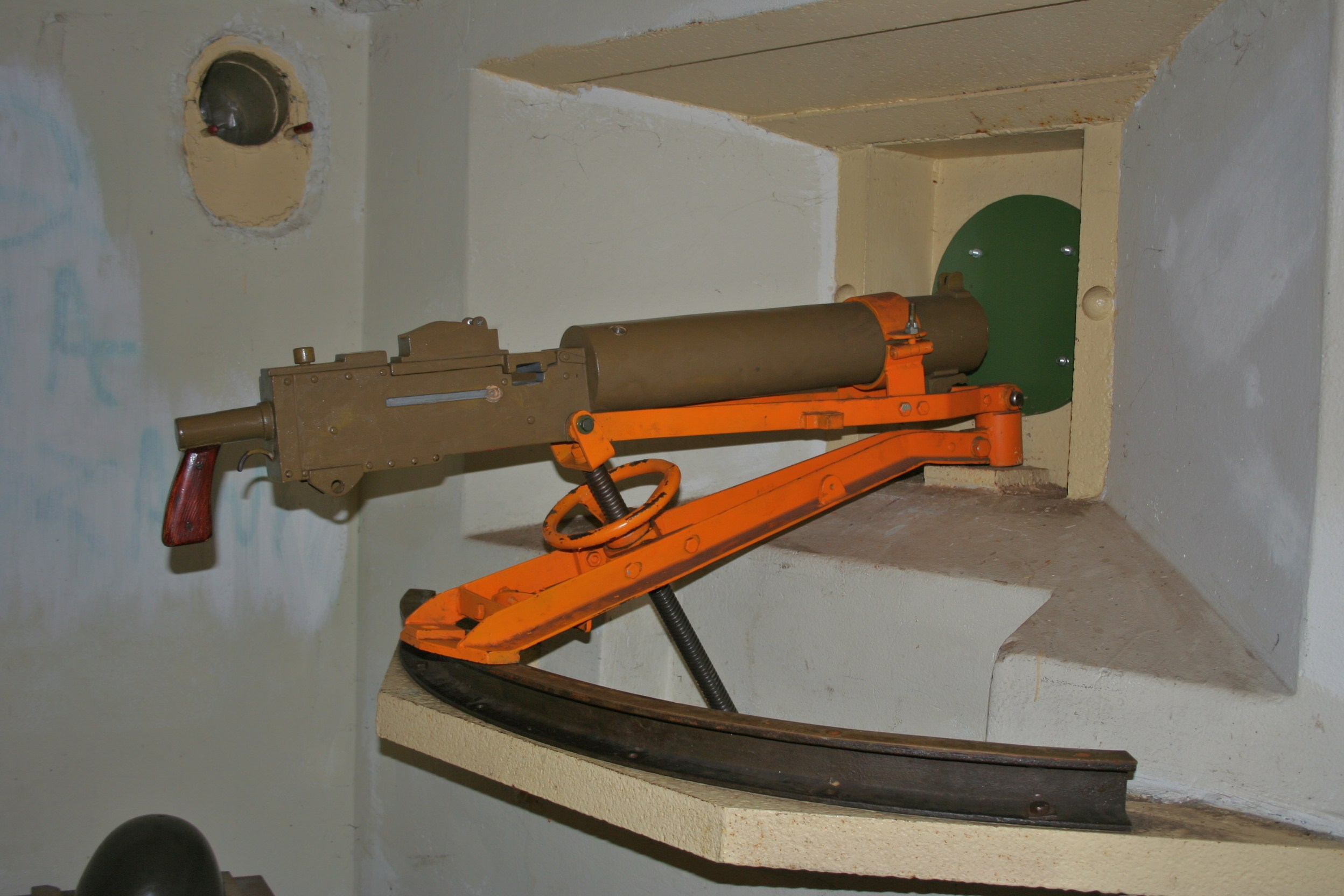
The heavy machine gun in its casemate, judging by the look of the gun it is an CKM wz. 30, a version of the American M.1917 water-cooled machine gun.

The Sabala heavy infantry bunker was the command center of the Jastarnia Line, and has thick concrete walls. The walls were 150 cm (59 in) thick and the roof was 140 cm thick, all made out of reinforced concrete. Sabala is located where the main road and the rail line met in the 1930s, making it an important defense during its time. Today the bunker houses a museum that is free to visit. Like all of the main bunkers of the Jastarnia Line, Sabala has a machine gun dome and 37 mm anti-tank gun in a casemate, but the armored 37 mm turret had not been installed when war broke out. The fort houses a small museum showing the equipment that was standard in 1939.

=== Saragossa Bunker ===
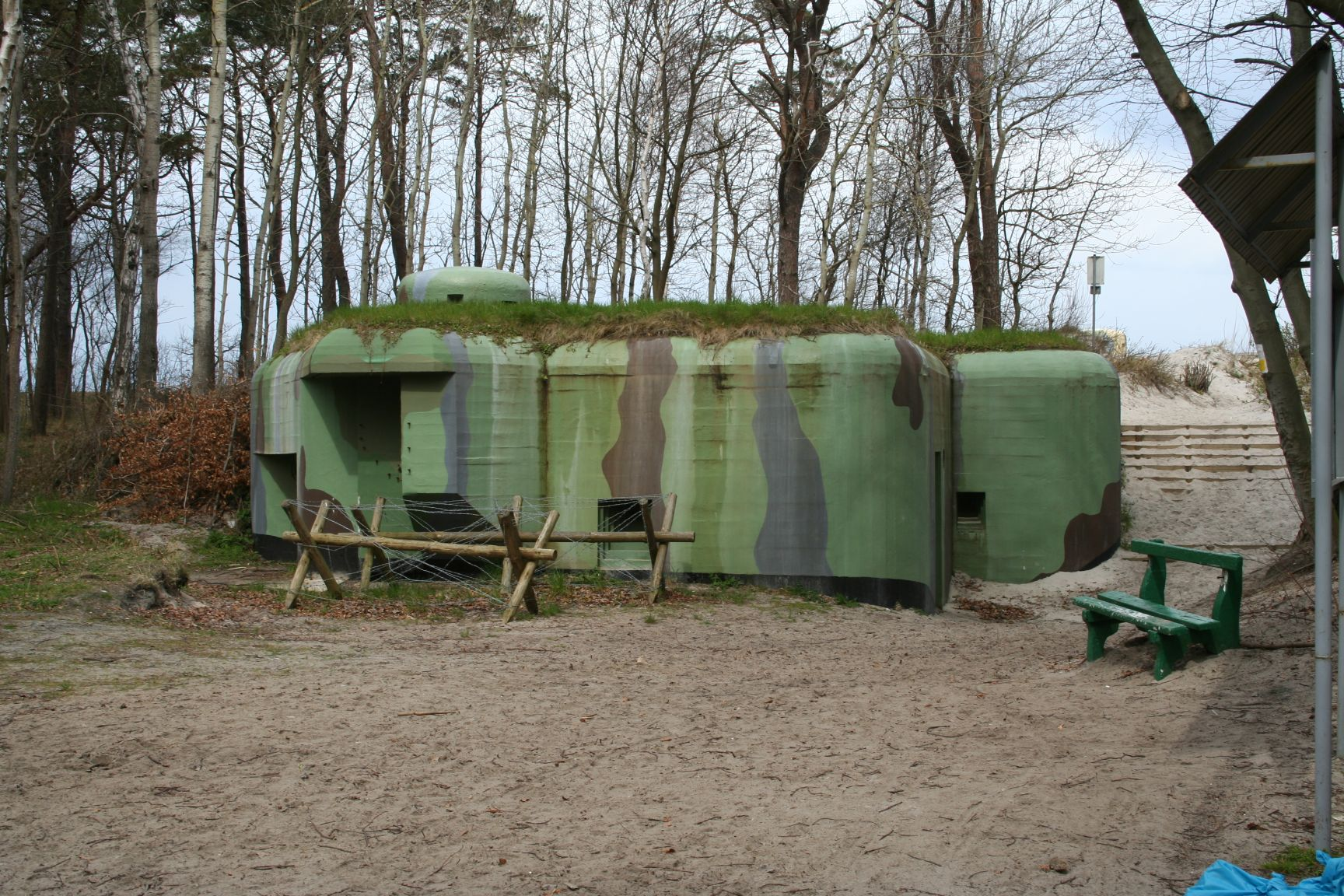
The Saragossa bunker with the entrance to the beach on the background.

The Saragossa heavy infantry bunker was located just a little southwest of the Sep Bunker. The walls were 130 cm thick and the roof was 140 cm thick, all made out of reinforced concrete. Like all the other heavy bunkers of the Jastarnia Line, Saragossa had an armored machine gun dome, a heavy machine gun in a casemate, and a 37 mm anti-tank gun in a casemate. There was supposed to be a 37 mm anti-tank gun mounted in an armored dome, but this had yet to be delivered or installed when World War II started. Today you are able to visit the bunker, but it might not be open.

=== Sokol Bunker ===
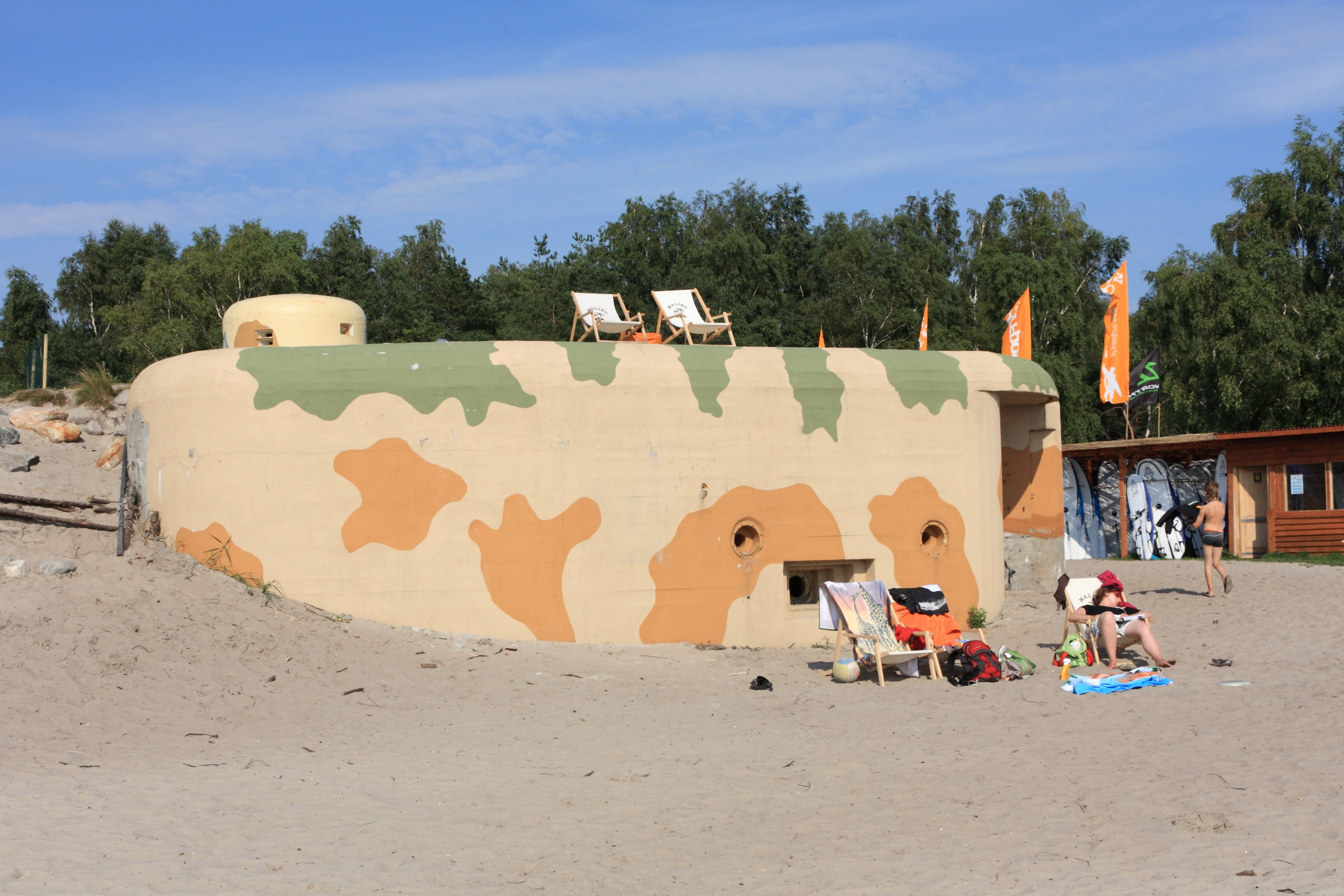
The Sokol Bunker as of 2009.

The Sokol heavy infantry bunker is located on the Bay of Puck on the southern side of the Jastarnia Line. Sokol was supposed to block an amphibious landing from the Bay of Puck. Since the bunker was hard to blend in with the sand, the walls were so heavily reinforced that the bunker could withstand a direct hit from a 220 mm (8.7 in) shell. The side walls were 330 cm (130 in) thick and the roof was 180 cm (71 in) thick. The bunker was armed with one machine gun in a 150 mm (5.9 in) thick armored dome, one heavy machine gun in a casemate, and one 37 mm anti-tank gun in a casemate. Sokol was supposed to be armed with a 37 mm anti-tank gun in a revolving armored dome, but it was not installed before World War II broke out. Today the bunker is part of a public beach, and you are able to enter.

=== Light Casemate "Jastarnia" ===
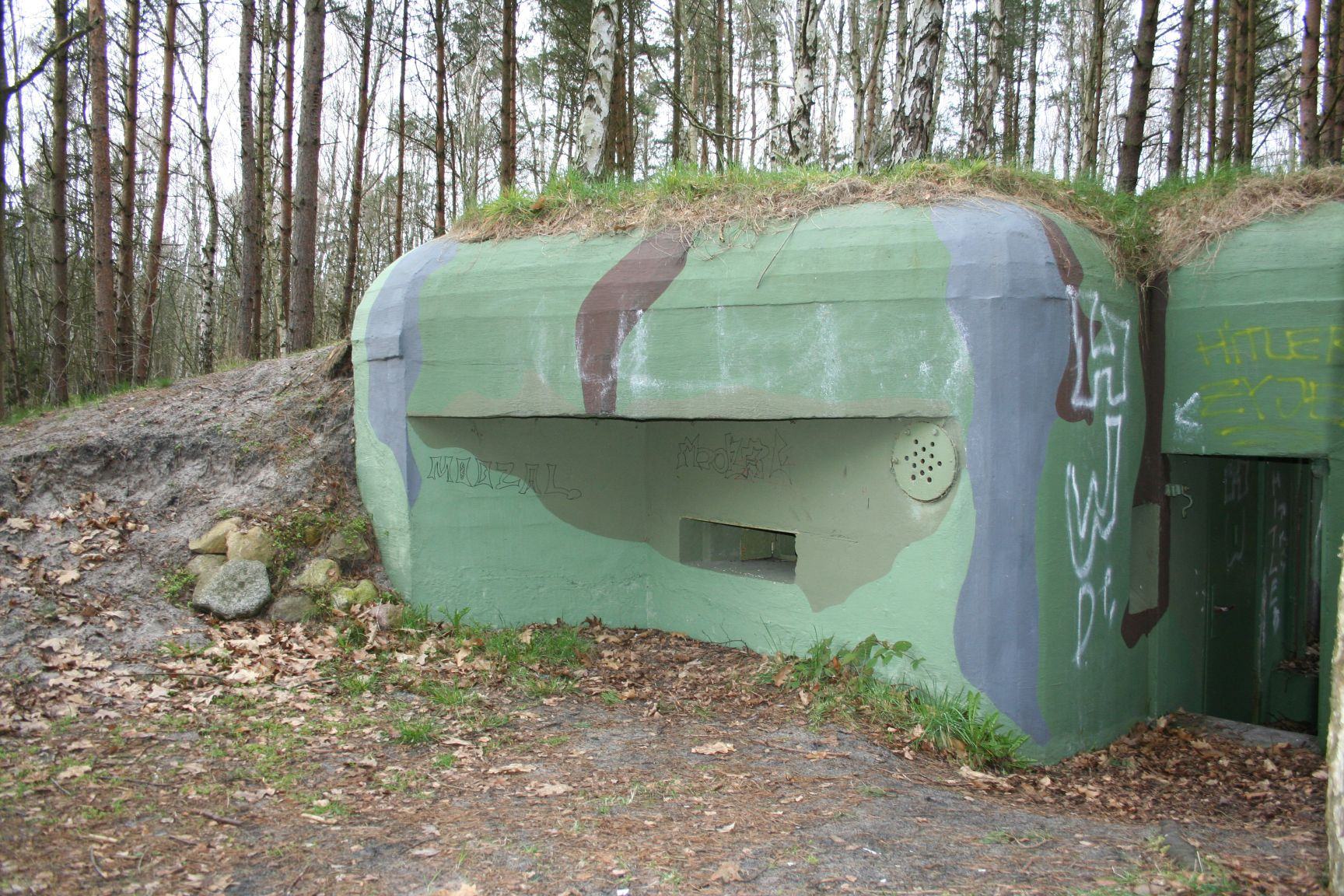
The "Jastarnia" light casemate as seen from the side, the door is faintly visible on the left side of the photo. You can also see 1 of the embrasures for small arms just to the left of the door.

The light casemate "Jastarnia", also known as the light combat shelter "Jastarnia", is the only one of four small bunkers in the Jastarnia Line completed before World War II broke out in September 1939. The bunker was meant as a secondary position in the Jastarnia Line, and is less heavily armed or armored than the frontline positions. The light casemate had 80 cm (31 in) thick walls and roof, and could withstand one direct hit from a 155 mm gun and multiple hits from 105 mm guns. The light casemate has two ports covering the entrance for which small arms could be fired out of. In the front, facing towards the west, was a casemate that was fitted with a heavy machine gun. The casemate was accessed via a door covered by a concrete support directly in front and the entrances to the covered area were facing north and south. The interior was informally reinforced with steel and sheet metal as additional protection. The light casemate was ventilated by opening a hatch on the back wall. The casemate was located 300 m (330 yd) behind the main defenses, facing west. The work on the light casemates began in May 1939, which is why only this one was completed.

=== Stationary anti-tank defenses ===
Just in front of the main four bunkers, were steel beams, also known as anti-tank rails, placed into the ground and surrounded by concrete for extra stability. The first few lines of steel beams were oriented at a 45 degree angle facing west, while the second few lines were standing straight up. Since the beams were smaller, they could only stop smaller tanks like the Panzer I or Panzer II.

== See also ==
- Hel Fortified Area
