= Main Directorate of Information of the Polish Army =

Main Directorate of Information of the Polish Army Główny Zarząd Informacji Wojska Polskiego
- Common name: Informacja Wojskowa
- Abbreviation: GZI WP

Agency overview
- Formed: 1944
- Dissolved: 1957

Jurisdictional structure
- Operations jurisdiction: Poland
- General nature: Military police

Operational structure
- Headquarters: Warsaw
- Elected officer responsible: Edward Ochab
- Parent agency: Polish People's Army

Główny Zarząd Informacji Wojska Polskiego (English: Main Directorate of Information of the Polish Army) was an early military Police and counter-espionage organ of the Polish People's Army in communist Poland during and after World War II. It is also known by its acronym GZI WP (sometimes shortened to GZI) or simply as Informacja Wojskowa (lit. 'Military Information') .

== History ==
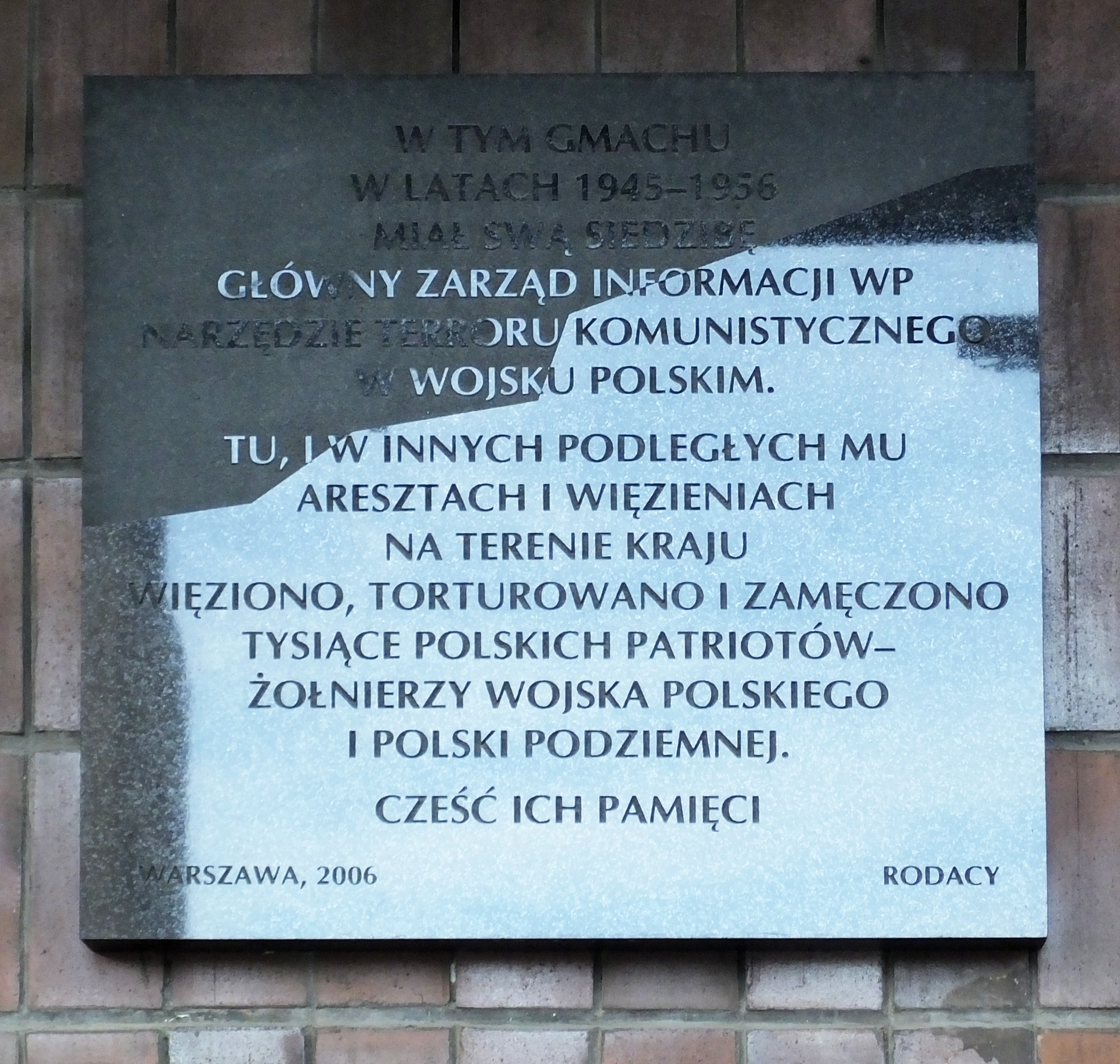
A plaque commemorating the victims of GZI on the building of the former headquarters at 3b Chałubińskiego Street

The GZI was established in 1944 as part of the Polish Military in the USSR. When it was founded, its officers were predominantly Russian, having been sourced from the Soviet secret services like the NKGB, the NKVD, and SMERSH. In December 1945, the number of Poles in the GZI did not surpass 43%, but by 1946–1947, it had grown to 77%. At the GZI's headquarters in Warsaw, the commendatory staff was initially entirely Russian and the first Polish officer was not installed until the end of 1945. By September 1947, almost all important positions at the headquarters were occupied by Polish army officers. In June 1950 headquarters again had been placed under the management of a Russian officer when Dmitrij Wozniesieński (a former SMERSH officer) became the head of GZI. With him came 150 new Russian officers who retook over all executive posts.

In 1945, the number of staff surpassed 1,000 officers. In the next year, because of the demobilization of the armed forces, the number of staff fell to 992. Increasing repression on Army, Navy and Air Force officers, and the very fast development of the new Polish People's Army, again forced GZI to increase its manpower and the number of new posts. Whilst in January 1951, the number of permanent employees in GZI was 2,740 (1,002 officers, 302 non-commissioned officers, 1,198 privates and 238 civil employees), by January 1953 the number of permanent employees had reached 4,130 people (1,502 officers, 453 non-commissioned officers, 1,795 privates and 380 civilian employees). New informers and secret agents were recruited from regular army, navy and air force units. The biggest number of informers and secret agents was in 1952, when for a total of 356,481 Polish army soldiers there were 24,025 informers and secret agents, working inside military structure. At that time, every seventh soldier in the Polish military was in contact with a GZI officer. It was the approved norm that at least one agent from the GZI should be in each platoon.

=== Changes and reform ===
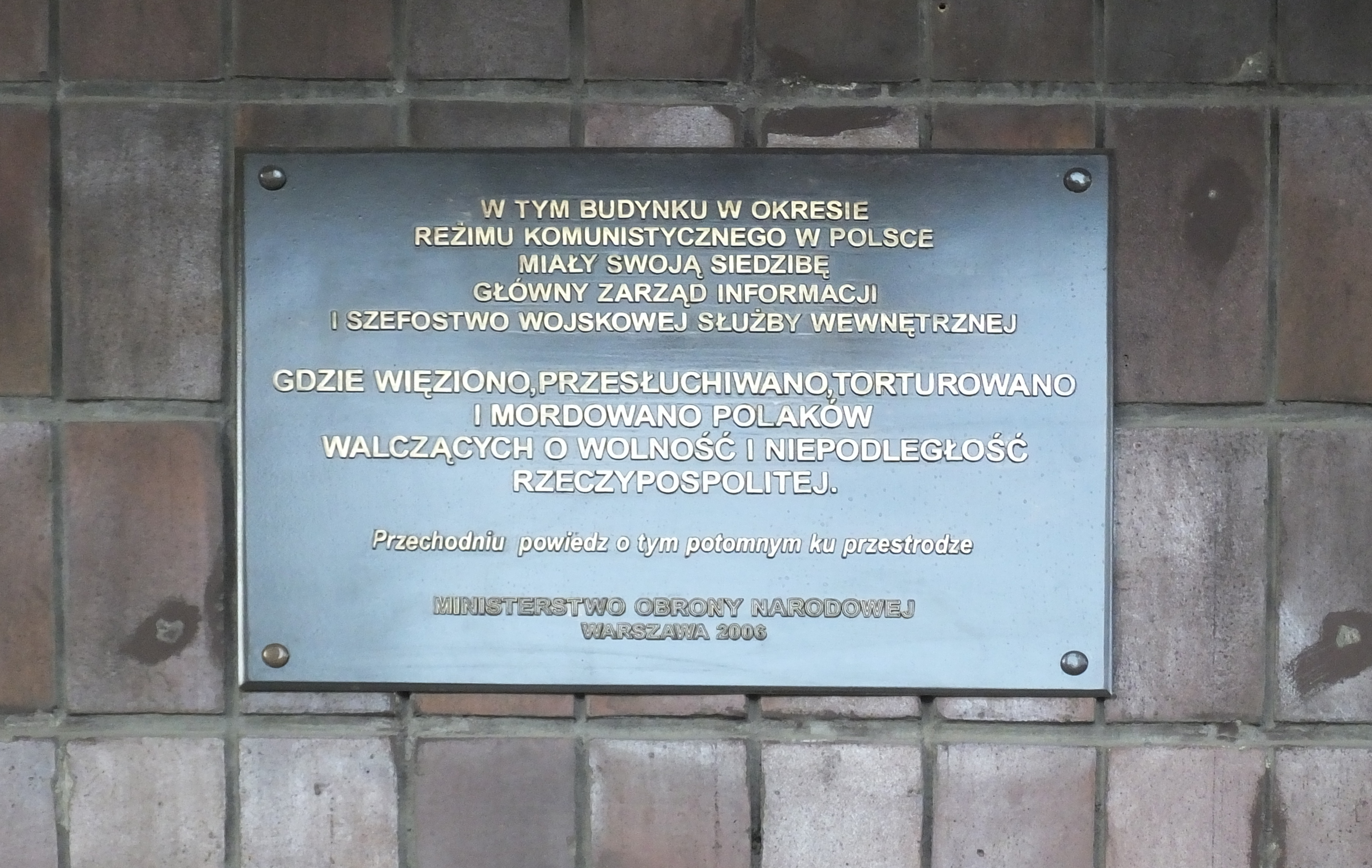
A plaque commemorating the victims of GZI and Internal Military Service on the building of the former headquarters at 3b Chałubińskiego Street

In September 1955 Główny Zarząd Informacji Ministerstwa Obrony Narodowej became part of the Committee for Public Security (Polish: Komitet do spraw Bezpieczeństwa Publicznego; which directly translates from the Russian Komitet gosudarstvennoy bezopasnosti), which was the well known successor to Ministerstwo Bezpieczeństwa Publicznego. The Committee for Public Security then became known as the Main Directorate of Information of Committee for Public Security (GZI KdsBP). It was responsible for the political police, counter-intelligence operations, intelligence operations, and government protection. In November 1956, the GZI KdsBP separated from Committee for Public Security, and returned to its previous role, becoming again the Main Directorate of Information of Ministry of National Defense.

After the reform instituted by Władysław Gomułka in 1956, and the role GZI played in repressions and executions, one year later in 1957 the Main Directorate of Information of Ministry of National Defense was dismantled and replaced by Internal Military Service (WSW; English: Military Internal Service).

In 1990 the WSW was merged with the Second Department of Polish General Staff, so that Intelligence and counter-intelligence agents were working under one structure. The agency created by the merger became known as Zarząd II Wywiadu i Kontrwywiadu (English: 2nd Directorate for Intelligence and Counter-intelligence). The organization structure was accepted by minister of national defence General Flolrian Siwicki, but at the same time, the Polish military and political establishment wasn't happy about the huge size of 2nd Directorate. Eventually, a decision was made to separate the law enforcement part responsible for law and order in military and create a new organization called Zandarmeria Wojskowa. The remaining post-communist services KI, and military intelligence were transformed in to the Wojskowe Służby Informacyjne (WSI; English: Military Information Services).

== Structure and organization ==
When the agency was founded it was responsible for the:

- Counter-espionage in the Polish Army.
- Protection of Army's structure and its unit’s against sabotage.
- Exposure and neutralising of members of anti-state organizations or political parties in the army's units or structure.
- Exposure and neutralising of members of anti-state organizations or political parties in the army's units or structure that were acting or planning to act against the Polish Committee of National Liberation.
- Prevent and punish cases of desertion and high treason.
- Establish and run nets of secret informers amongst soldiers and officers inside army structure.
- Secure important military infrastructure and installations.

The GZI was originally organised into eight Oddział (English: Branches), which were supported and overseen by the "Office of Strategic Supplies" and the commendatory. By the end of 1945, GZI was made of nine sections and eight lower rank independent sections and detachments. The eight Oddział were:

- Oddział 1: Intelligence work in General Staff of the Polish Army. Known as "Section 1".
- Oddział 2: Exposing and naturalizing enemy Intelligence agents, interrogation of German POW's.
- Oddział 3: Running GZI field organs in army groups, divisions, and military districts.
- Oddział 4: Investigations.
- Oddział 5: Revisions, apprehensions, establishing, external observation.
- Oddział 6: Personnel recruitment, selection and training, formation of new units.
- Oddział 7: Personal Record and operation statistics.
- Oddział 8: Codes and communications.

=== List of chiefs ===
The person in command of GZI was its "chief". The chief was responsible for GZI actions, and reported directly to first the vice-minister or minister of National Defense.

- Piotr Kożuszko, 1944–1945
- Jan Rutkowski, 1945–1947
- Stefan Kuhl, 1947–1950
- Dmitrij Wozniesieński, 1950–1953
- Karol Bąkowski, 1953–1956
- Aleksander Kokoszyn, 1956–1957

== Repression ==
From 1944 to 1957 GZI WP played a role in cleansing the army of officers and soldiers from the pre-war Polish army who were admitted into the new, Polish People's Army, and was responsible for repressions and executions on Home Army soldiers.

=== Main cases ===
- Tatar-Utnik-Nowicki
- Trial of the Generals
- The Commandors case (Stanisław Mieszkowski, Zbigniew Przybyszewski, Jerzy Staniewicz - death)

== In popular media ==
- The 1982 film Interrogation directed by Ryszard Bugajski shows an operation of the GZI.

== See also ==
- History of the Polish Army
- History of Polish Intelligence Services
