= ORP Gryf =

Three warships of the Polish Navy have borne the name ORP Gryf, named after the Polish word for griffon:

- ORP Gryf (1936), a large minelayer launched in 1936 and notable for her role during the Invasion of Poland in 1939. She was sunk in Hel harbour by German planes on 3 September 1939.
- ORP Gryf (1957), a school and hospital ship of the Polish Navy, launched in 1944 as the German ship Irene Oldendorff and handed over in 1950 to the Polish Navy. Rebuilt as a school and hospital ship, she was initially named ORP Zetempowiec, being renamed Gryf in 1957. She was decommissioned in 1976 but continued in use as a heating barge and accommodation ship.
- ORP Gryf (1976), a school and hospital ship of the Polish Navy. She was launched in 1976 as a replacement for the earlier Gryf and is currently in service.
