= Hel Fortified Area =

Fortified district on the Hel peninsula in Poland

- Rejon Umocniony Hel
- Poland
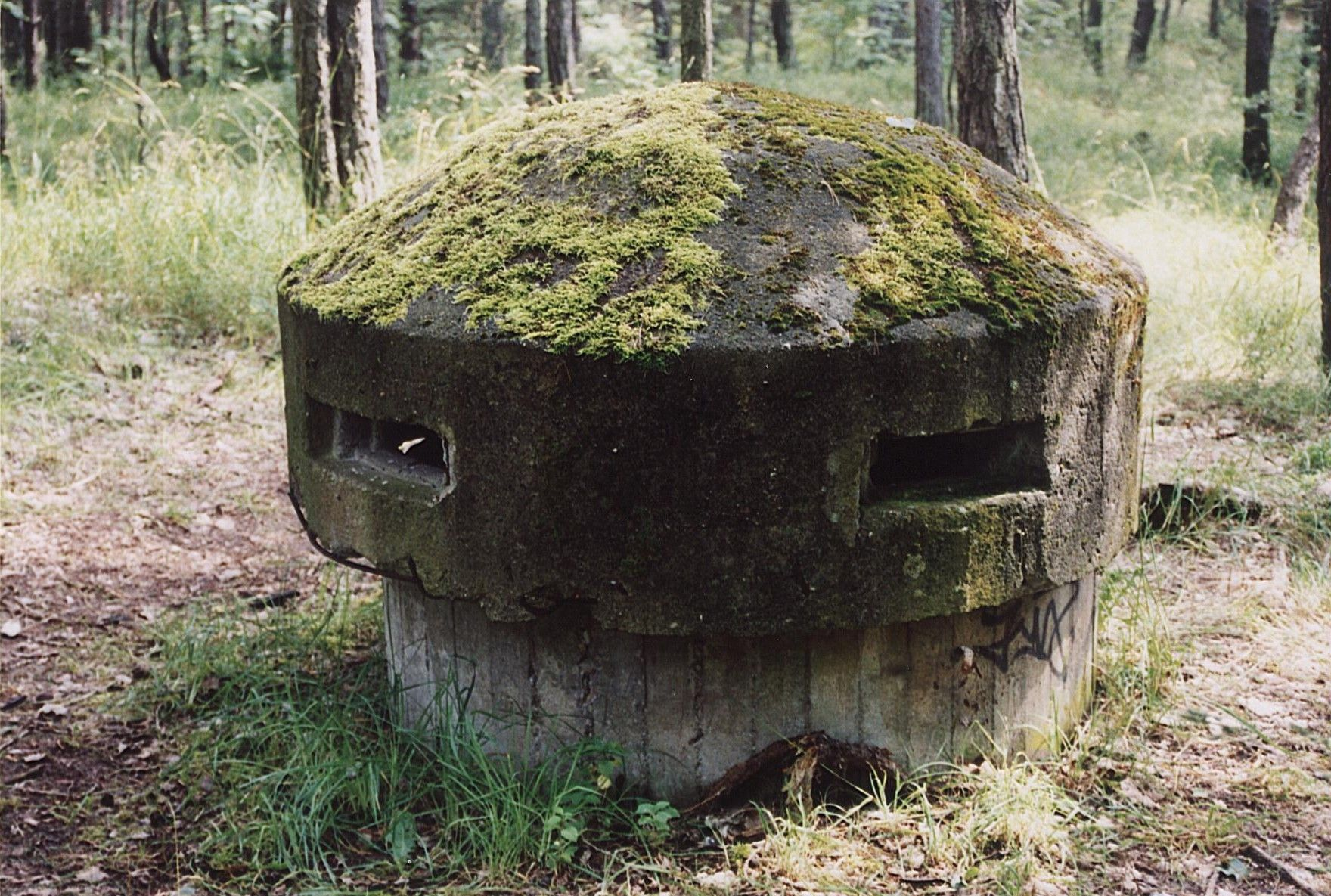

Site information
- Type: Defensive line
- Open to the public: yes
- Condition: Mostly abandoned, some objects are museums or still existing military bases

Location
- Coordinates: 54°37′N 18°47′E

Site history
- Built: 1935
- Built by: Polish Navy
- In use: 1935-2003
- Battles/wars: Battle of Hel (1939)
- Events: World War II

The Hel Fortified Area (Polish: Rejon Umocniony Hel) was a set of Polish fortifications, constructed on the Hel Peninsula in northern Poland, in close proximity to the interwar border of Poland and the Third Reich. It was created in 1936, upon a decree of President Ignacy Mościcki. It covered most part of the peninsula, and during Polish September Campaign, it was the last place of Poland to surrender to the invading Wehrmacht (for more information, see Battle of Hel). During World War II, the naval base in Hel was used as a major training facility for U-boat crews.

== History ==
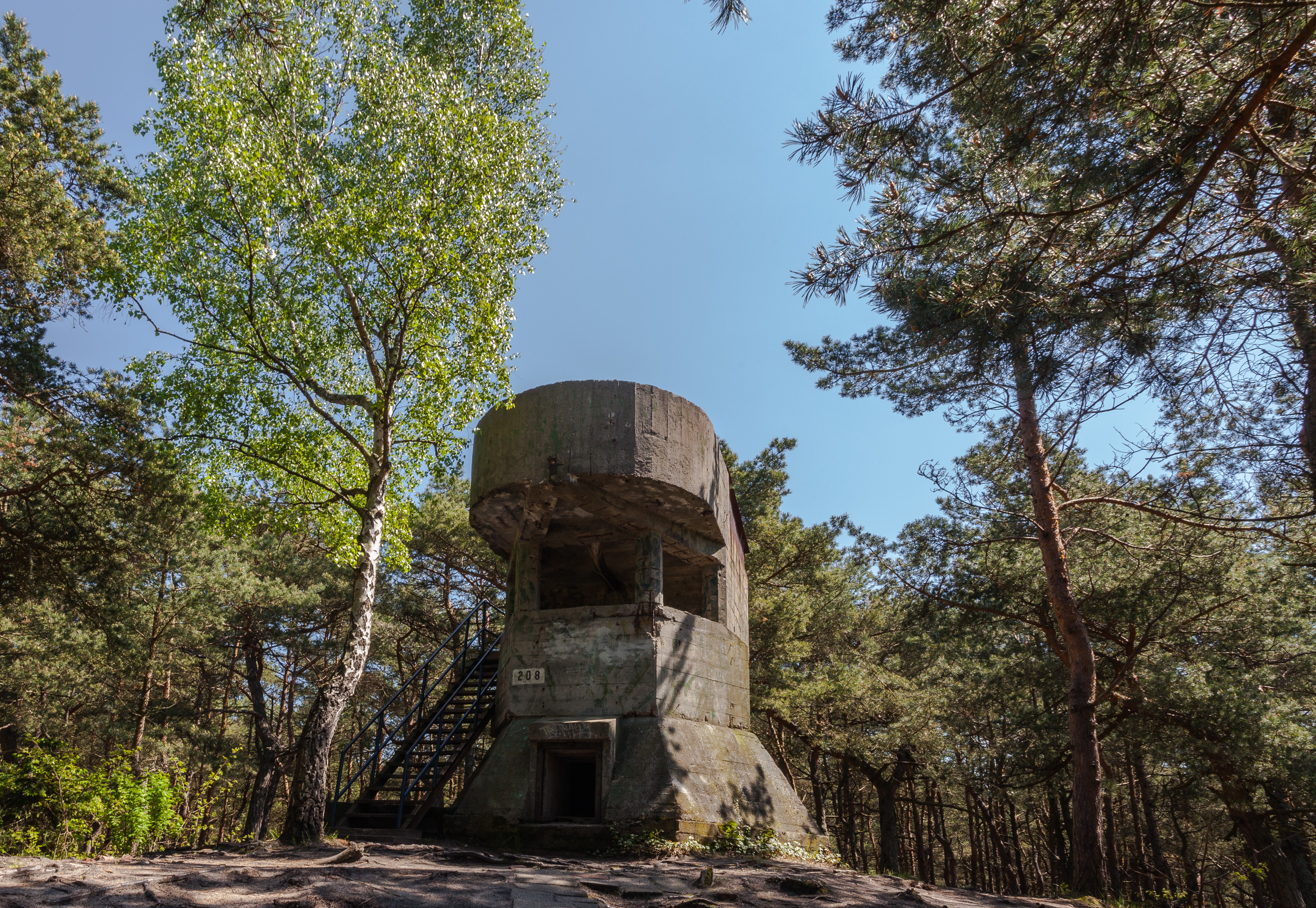
Observation tower

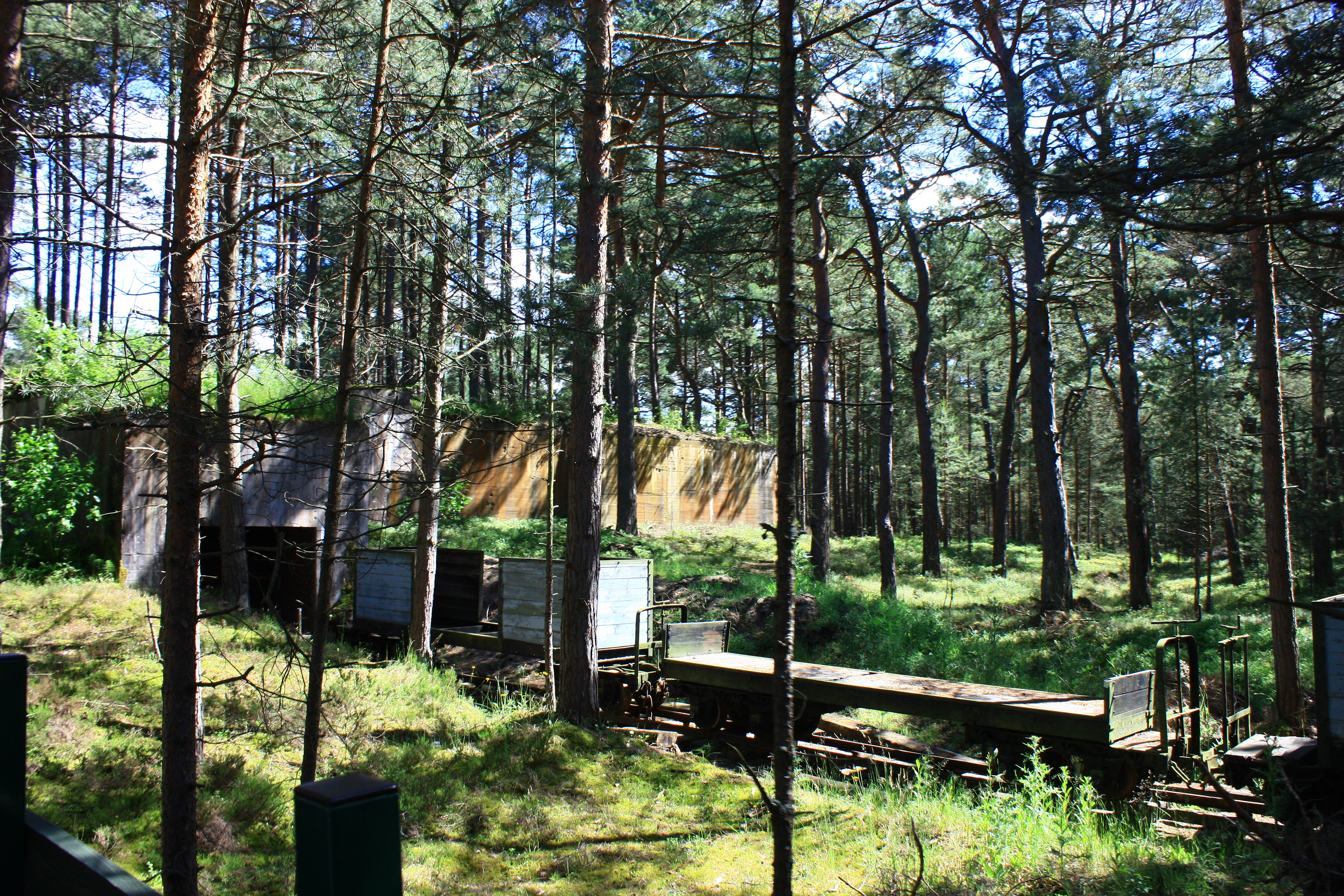
Most of the military installations were connected by a narrow-gauge railway line

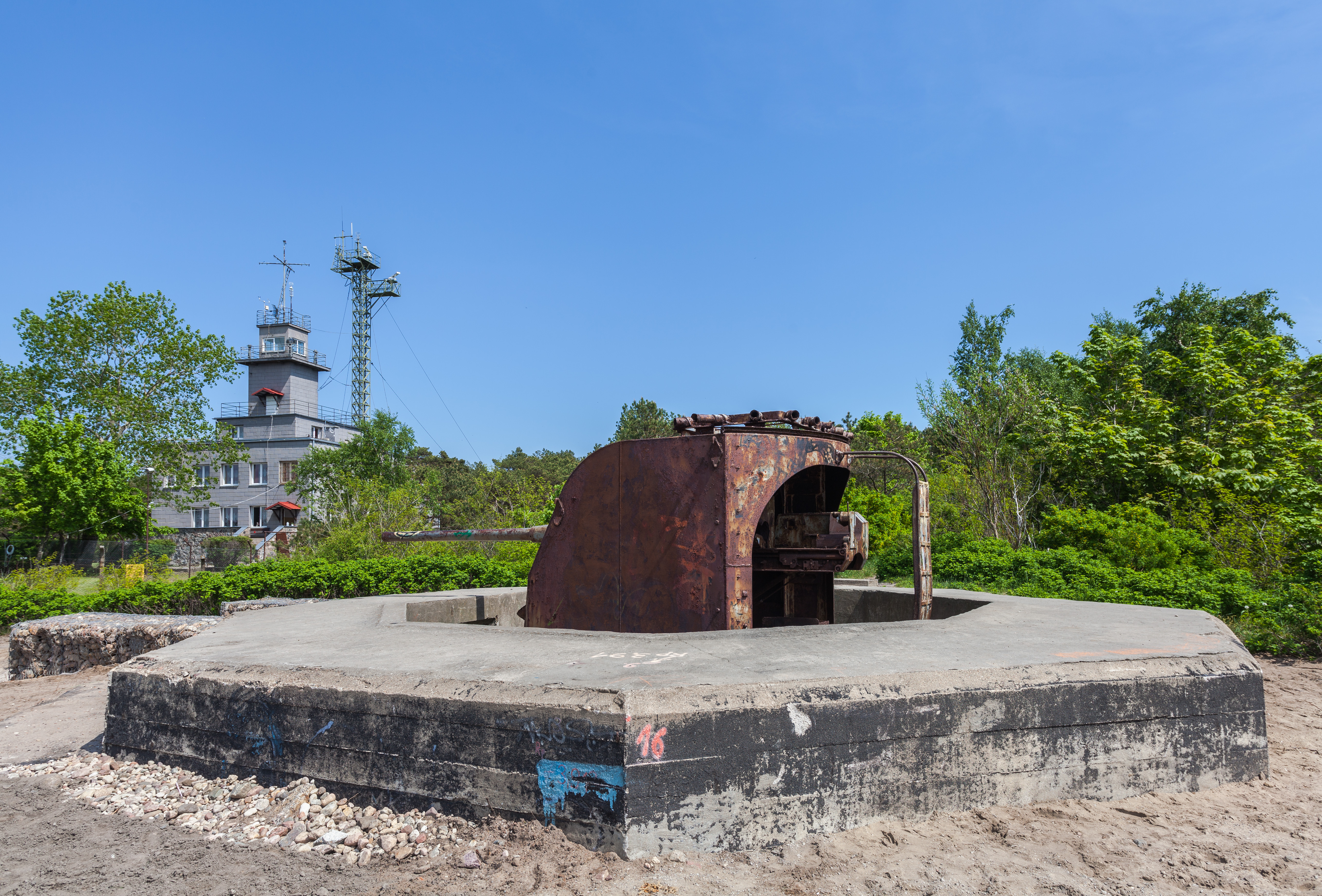
100 mm B-34U gun

After Poland regained independence in autumn 1918, and the symbolic wedding ceremony with the Baltic Sea by units of the Polish Army under General Józef Haller de Hallenburg (Puck, 10 February 1920), Polish military authorities began preparations of a fortified army garrison along the coast. As early as 22 July 1920 General Kazimierz Sosnkowski ordered construction of a strategic rail line which ran from Puck, through Wladyslawowo, to Hel. The line was completed in 1921, together with telegraph connection, by the logistics units of the Polish Army. A road was constructed along the line.

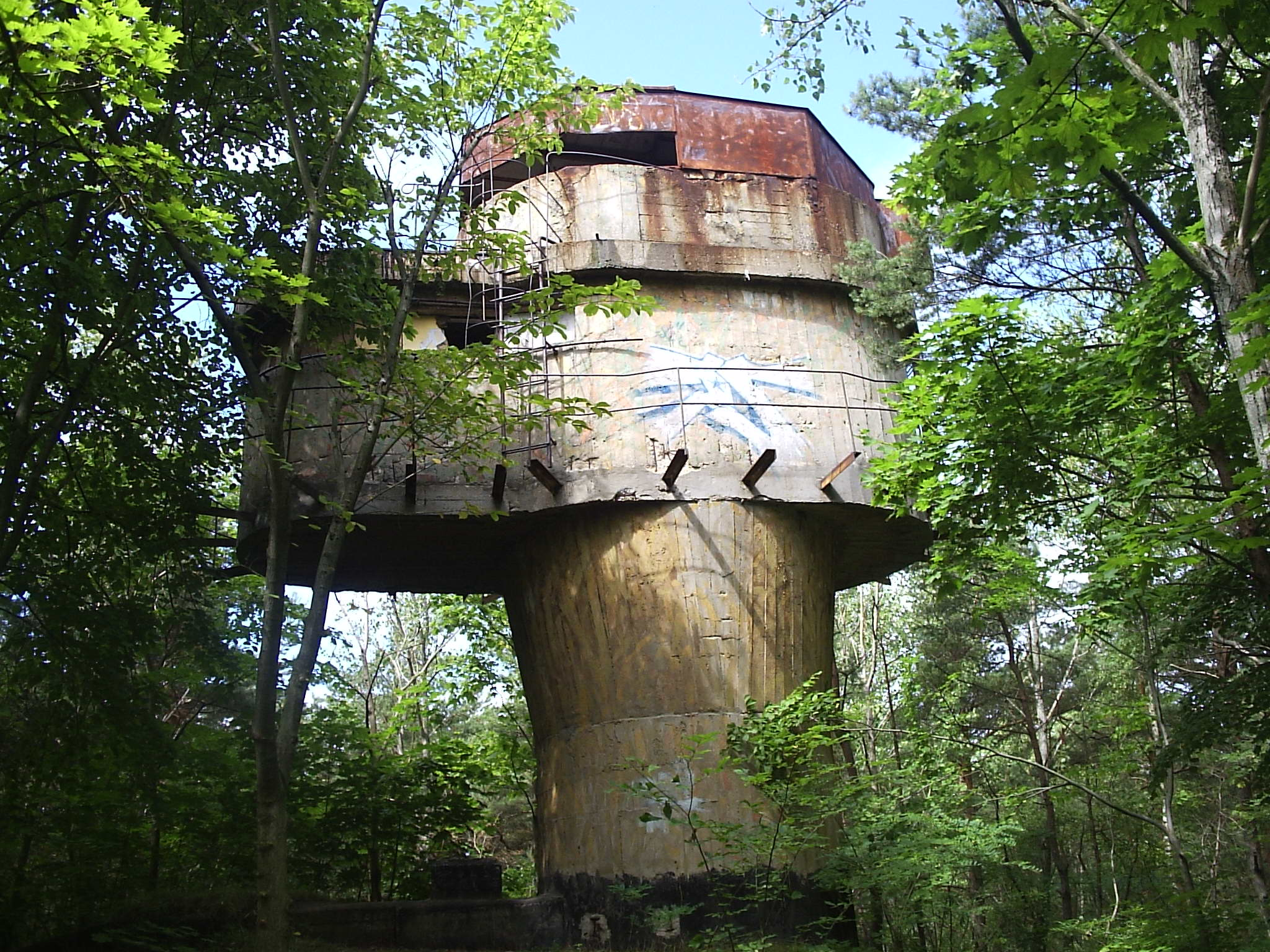
Fire control tower at Hel

In 1931, Polish Army began the construction of the naval base in Hel. At the same time, the tip of the peninsula, from Jurata to Hel, was placed under military administration. Construction of new houses and tourist facilities was forbidden, movement of civilians was strictly limited. These regulations were strengthened by the decree of President Ignacy Mościcki, signed on 21 August 1936, which officially created the Hel Fortified Area.

Soon afterwards large-scale works began. A network of rail connections, mostly narrow-gauge, was built, together with concrete-strengthened artillery positions. Armaments and military equipment were brought. The Army started modernization of the naval base at Hel. The base, designed by Wlodzimierz Szawernowski, had been built in 1931, by a Polish-French Enterprise in a location known as Stary Hel (Old Hel). An underground power plant was placed some 1.5 kilometers north of the port, also in adjacent forests, shelters for ammunition, mines and torpedoes were built. An underground petroleum storage reservoir was constructed, with a pipeline to the port. Even though the Hel Fortified Area was not officially created until 1936, Polish Army had been purchasing equipment for it earlier. In July 1935, four Swedish-made Bofors guns (152 mm) were bought and brought to Gdynia aboard transport ship ORP Wilia. Transported to Hel by train, the guns were mounted in October 1935 as a Heliodor Laskowski's Artillery Battery No. 31 (XXXI).

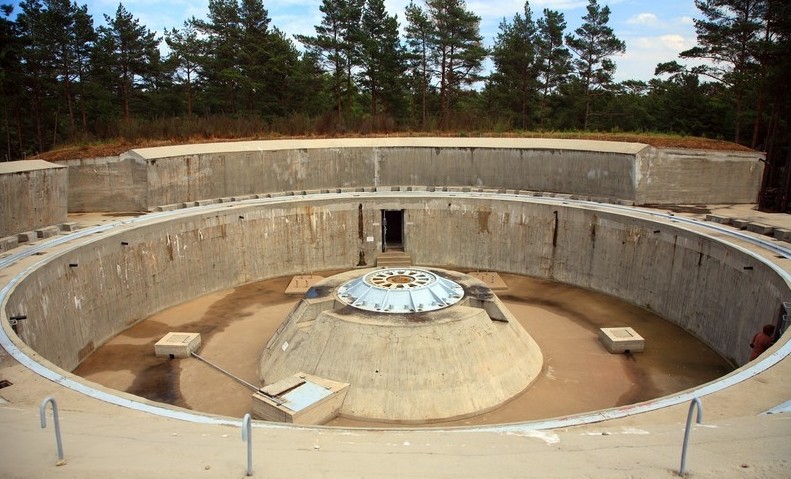
B2 Schleswig-Holstein battery

== World War II and postwar ==
Units of the Wehrmacht approached the peninsula on 9 September 1939. Hel, manned by some 2000 Polish soldiers, was the longest-defended pocket of the Polish Army during the whole campaign. Cut off from the mainland on 14 September and shelled with 280 millimeter guns, it surrendered on 1 October 1939 after a fierce defense, during which many German planes were shot down. Some sources, such as Dictionary of Battles and Sieges, put the date of surrender on 2 October 1939.

During the German occupation of Poland, Hel, reverting to its German name of Hela, was a major training facility of U-boat crews. Almost immediately after cessation of hostilities, the Germans began further construction work on the base. Among others, the Schleswig-Holstein battery was built for three 40.6 cm SK C/34 guns ("Adolf guns"). These guns fired shells of up to 1030 kilograms, and their range was up to 56 kilometers. Toward the end of the war, the Germans began construction of an airfield, but it was never completed. The Wehrmacht also installed Würzburg-Riese radar stations, as Hela was supposed to defend the main naval port of Gdynia, renamed Gotenhafen. On the night of 3–4 April 1945, the Germans carried out Operation Walpurgisnacht, during which thousands of soldiers and refugees were transported from Gdynia to Hela. The German soldiers on the peninsula repelled several Soviet attacks and surrendered on 14 May 1945, six days after Germany had capitulated.

In the Polish People's Republic, Hel did not lose its strategic importance. The peninsula was among the most protected military bases of the country. The base was rebuilt and strengthened, with Soviet-made guns of 130 mm. As time went on, new military doctrine reduced the value of coastal artillery. Because of that, all coastal batteries in Poland were decommissioned. Everything that remained was in 1999 designated as military monuments.

== Currently ==
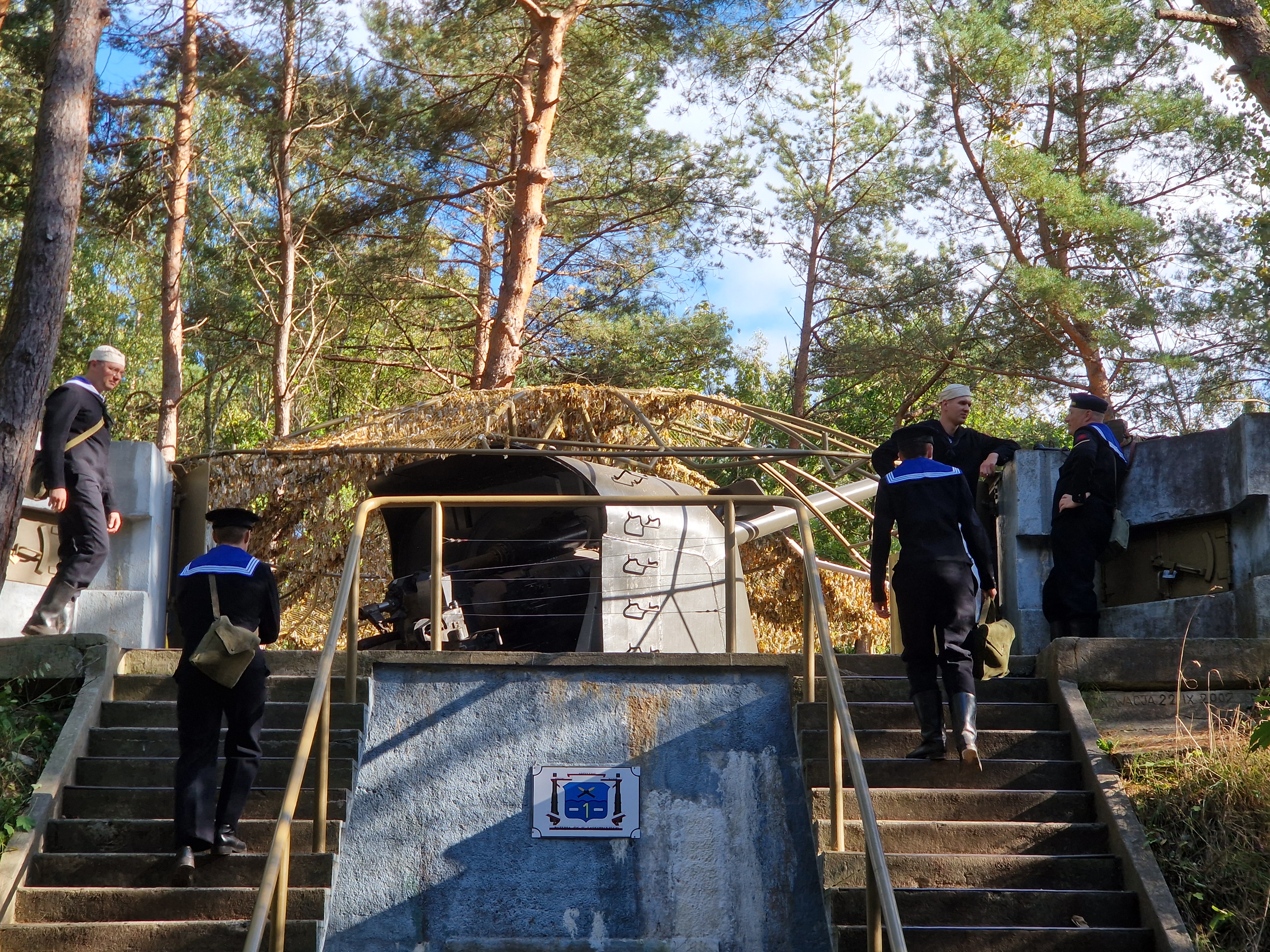
Heliodor Laskowski's Artillery Battery No. 31 (XXXI), 2024

Entry to some areas of the Hel Fortified Area is restricted by the military, but most places are open to tourists. Among the most notable monuments are:

- Heliodor Laskowski's Artillery Battery No. 31 (XXXI) (1935), where in late 1930s, four Bofors 152 mm guns were placed. In 1948, the battery was redone, its name was changed to 13 BAS, and Soviet-made B-13 130 mm naval guns were mounted. One of these guns can still be seen,
- battery number 21 (1935), where 2 Schneider 75 mm guns were placed,
- post of four Soviet-made B-34U 100 mm guns (1955), with one of them still located there,
- six posts of the Schleswig-Holstein battery. They were built by the Germans in 1940. Made of reinforced concrete, they displayed three 40,6 centimeter guns SK C/34 "Adolf". Together with posts, bunkers, observation tower, and magazines for ammunition were built,
- battery number 31 – located at the headland,
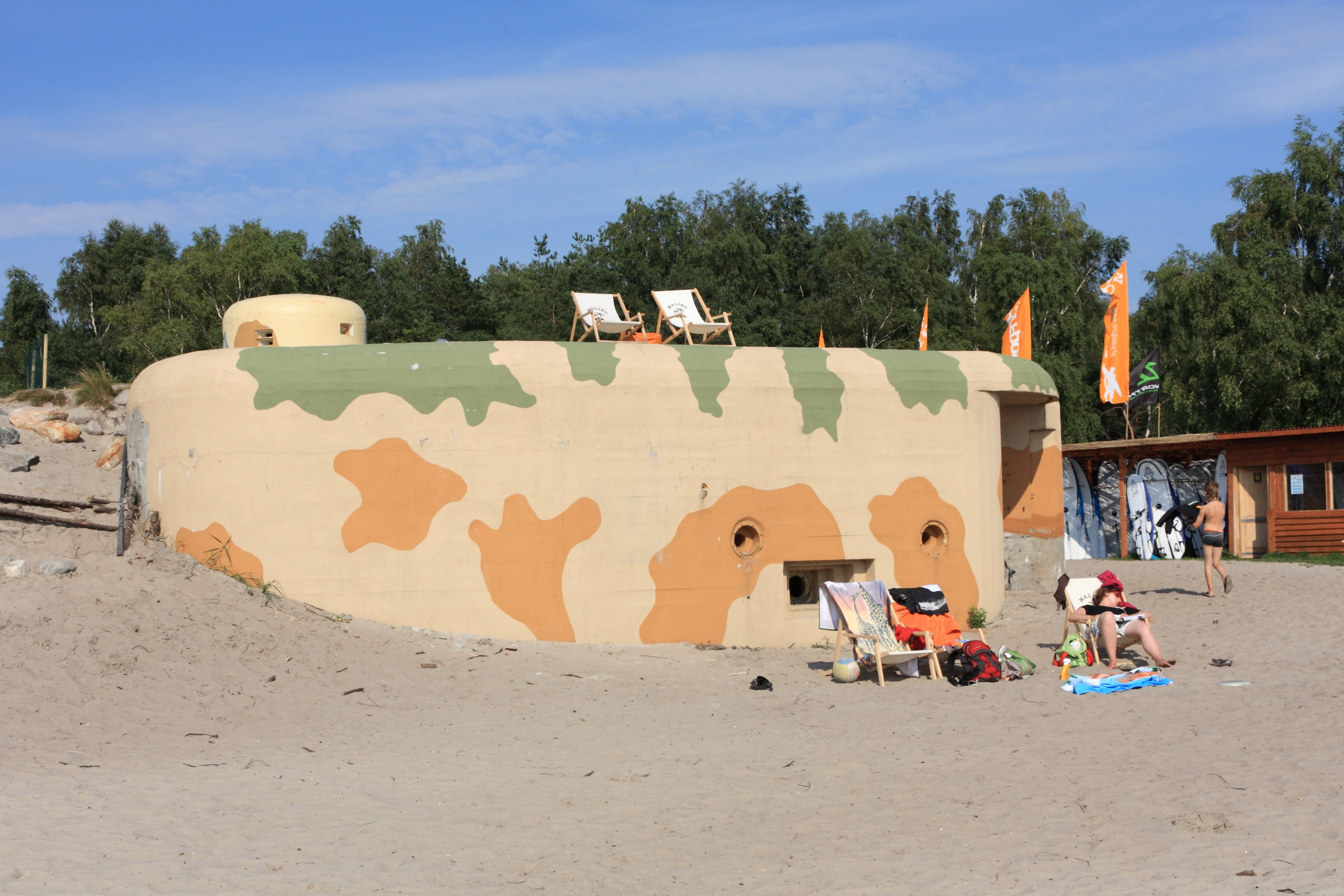
  Bunker "Sokół" lies currently within a camping and windsurfing site.
  battery number 33 ("Greek") (originally two field guns Schneider 105 mm), in mid-distance from Hel to Jurata,
- battery number 32 ("Danish") (originally two field guns Schneider 105 mm), at northern tip of the town of Hel,
- battery number 41, west of Jastarnia, aimed at the Gdańsk Bay,
- battery number 42, east of Jastarnia, aimed at the Baltic Sea,
- battery number 43, near the port of Władysławowo, on 8 September 1939, moved to Chałupy,
- in Jastarnia, there are four bunkers of the Jastarnia Defensive Line, the main line of Polish defenses across the Hel Peninsula. These bunkers are named Sokół, Sabała, Saragossa, and Sęp.

In 1999, the fortifications of Hel were added to the Polish military monuments register. All information about Hel and its fortified area you can find in Hel Tourist Guide (in English), 2019 year, ISBN 978-83-65092-30-4.

== See also ==
- Sarny Fortified Area
- Fortified Area of Silesia
