= Pollux (1900) =

Polish tugboat from the interwar period

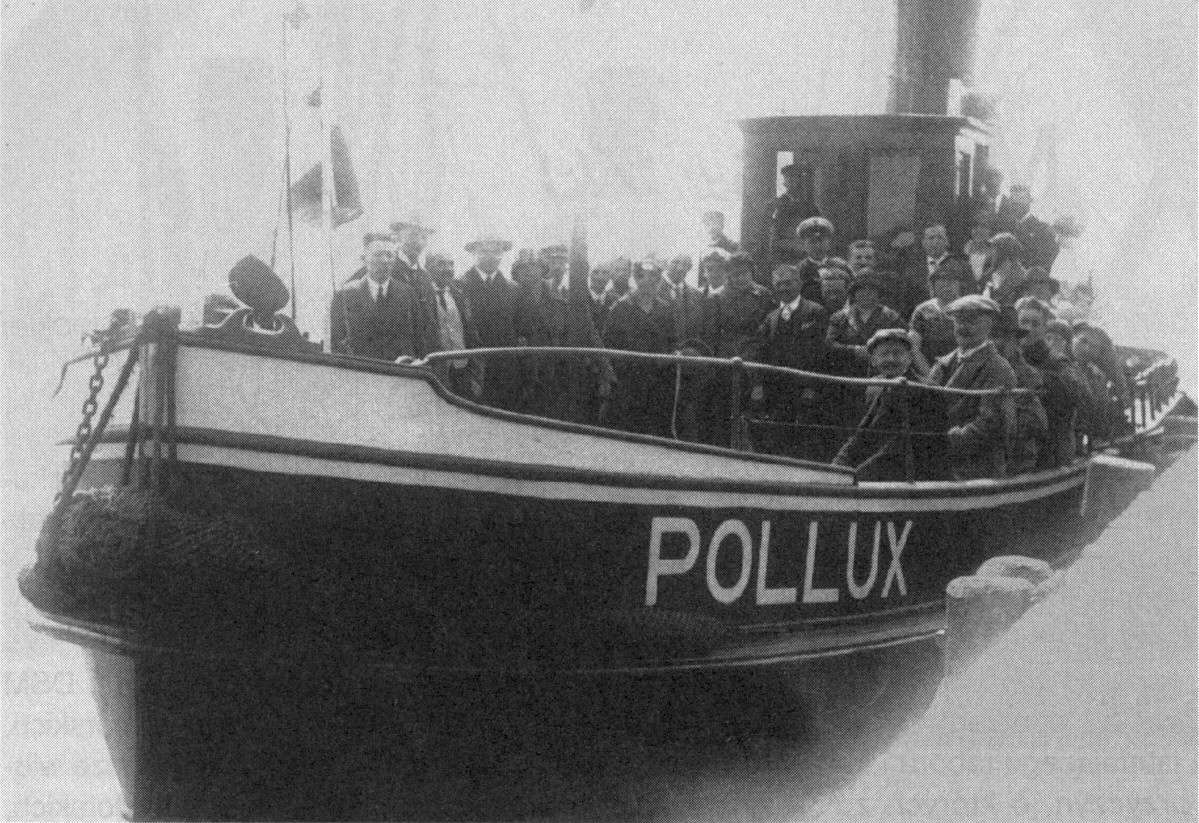

History

German Empire
- Name: Pollux
- Builder: Gdańsk
- Launched: 1900

History

Polish Armed Forces
- Name: Pollux
- Commissioned: 1920
- Decommissioned: 1922

History

Polish Merchant Navy
- Name: Pollux
- Commissioned: 1922
- Decommissioned: 1925

History

Free City of Danzig
- Name: Pollux
- Commissioned: 1926
- Decommissioned: 1936

History

Nazi Germany
- Name: Pollux
- Commissioned: 1939
- Decommissioned: after 1943
- Fate: unknown

General characteristics
- Type: Tugboat
- Length: 26.3 m (86 ft 3 in)
- Beam: 4.4 m (14 ft 5 in)
- Draft: 1.3 m (4 ft 3 in)
- Propulsion: steam engine with 140 horsepower; 1 propeller
- Capacity: 55 GRT
- Crew: 5

Pollux was a Polish tugboat from the interwar period. Built in 1900 at a German shipyard, likely in Gdańsk, it was acquired by Poland in spring 1920. From 1920 to 1922, it served in the Polish Navy, then transitioned to civilian use. In 1925, the tugboat was put up for sale and purchased by an shipowner from the Free City of Danzig. It remained in use at least until 1943, after which its fate is unknown. Alongside the concurrently acquired Castor, Pollux was one of the first tugboats in the Polish fleet.

== History ==
Following the acquisition of Pomerelia, granted to Poland by the Treaty of Versailles, which included only two small fishing ports – Hel and Puck – efforts were made to procure auxiliary vessels, as only a number of boats, fishing smacks, and merchant sailing vessels were inherited. The newly established Polish Navy, set to receive six former German torpedo boats as decided by the Conference of Ambassadors, required tugboats to assist in navigating ships into the confined port basin of the provisional Puck port and to maintain the fairway through the shallows of Bay of Puck.

In April and May 1920, the Naval Department of the Ministry of Military Affairs purchased a significant number of auxiliary vessels in the Free City of Danzig, including the tugboats Castor and Pollux. These were the first tugboats of the Polish Navy.

Pollux was constructed in 1900 at an unspecified German shipyard, likely in Gdańsk. Its name in Polish service referenced mythical Pollux, son of Zeus and Leda, and brother of Castor; its prior name, if any, is unknown.

== Technical specifications ==
Pollux was a flat-bottomed river and port tugboat with an overall length of 26.3 metres, a beam of 4.4 metres, and a draft of 1.3 metres. Its gross register tonnage was 55 BRT, and its net register tonnage was 7 NRT. The vessel was powered by a two-cylinder steam engine with double expansion, producing 140 hp, driving a single propeller.

The crew consisted of five members: a supervisor and four sailors.

== Service history ==
=== Polish Navy ===
Pollux was transferred to the Polish Navy in 1920, assigned by Ministry of Military Affairs Order No. 39 on 22 May to the Coast Command in Puck. Its home port was Puck. Its primary tasks included supporting dredgers and barges working in the Bay of Puck (deepening the "Depka" passage through Rybitwia Shoal) and in the port basins of Puck and Hel. Due to its small size and flat bottom, the vessel was operable in Gdańsk Bay only in favorable weather conditions.

Following the division of maritime affairs into civilian and military sectors, Pollux and Castor were removed from the navy's auxiliary vessel list on 1 January 1922 and transferred to the Merchant Navy Office in Wejherowo, under the administration of the Merchant Navy Department of the Ministry of Industry and Trade.

=== Civilian service ===
Despite the transfer, Pollux continued to support dredgers and barges in the Bay of Puck and maintained communication between the Puck port and the developing Port of Gdynia. During the summer season, lacking dedicated excursion vessels, Pollux and Castor transported official delegations and tourists, primarily to Hel. In June 1922, Pollux accompanied the training sailing ship Lwów to the outer shores of the Hel Peninsula for its two-month voyage. From August 1923, both tugboats performed towing and pilotage duties, assisting passenger ships and colliers docking at the provisional pier in Gdynia's port. In 1925, Pollux and Castor were permanently assigned to the Port Captaincy in Gdynia. After the acquisition of the larger, modern tugboat Ursus, which took over most towing duties in Gdynia, Pollux, with a faulty boiler, was deemed surplus and put up for auction in late 1925. In 1926, it was purchased by shipowner Albert Zimmermann from the Free City of Danzig. After repairs, the vessel, retaining its name, was used by its new owner at least until 1943. Its subsequent fate is unknown.

In 1936, the Maritime Office in Gdynia acquired and commissioned a new tugboat named Pollux.

== Bibliography ==
- Huras, Bohdan; Twardowski, Marek (2002). Księga statków polskich: 1918-1945 [Book of Polish Ships: 1918–1945] (in Polish). Vol. 4. Gdańsk: Polnord, Oskar. ISBN 83-86181-78-8.
