= Borchardt =

Borchardt is a surname. Notable people with the surname include:

- Alice Borchardt (1939–2007), American writer of historical fiction, fantasy and horror
- Carl Wilhelm Borchardt (1817–1880), German mathematician
- Curtis Borchardt (born 1980), American basketball player
- Diane Borchardt, American teacher and criminal, focus of the 1995 film Seduced by Madness
- Dietrich Borchardt (1916–1997), Australian librarian and bibliographer
- Erich Borchardt (1913–1944), Oberfeldwebel in the Wehrmacht
- Francis J. Borchardt, American politician
- Georges Borchardt, American literary agent
- Herbert Borchardt (1914–1944), Leutnant of the Reserves in the Wehrmacht
- Hugo Borchardt (1844–1924), German firearms inventor and engineer
- Jan-Christoph Borchardt (born 1989), German open source interaction designer
- Jon Borchardt (born 1957), American football guard
- Julian Borchardt (1868–1932), socialist activist
- Karol Olgierd Borchardt (1905–1986), Polish writer and captain
- Karolina Borchardt (1905–1995), Polish artist and aviator.
- Knut Borchardt (1929–2023), German researcher
- Ludwig Borchardt (1863–1938), German Egyptologist
- Mark Borchardt (born 1966), American independent filmmaker
- Paul Borchardt (1886–1953), German archaeologist
- Siegfried Borchardt (1953–2021), German neo-Nazi politician
- Simone Borchardt (born 1967), German politician
- Susan King Borchardt (born 1981), American basketball player

== See also ==
- 7.65×25mm Borchardt,
- Borchardt C-93 (1844–1921)
- Sharps-Borchardt Model 1878
- STS Kapitan Borchardt, Polish sail training ship
- Burchard (disambiguation)
