= Castor (1917 ship) =

1917 Polish tugboat

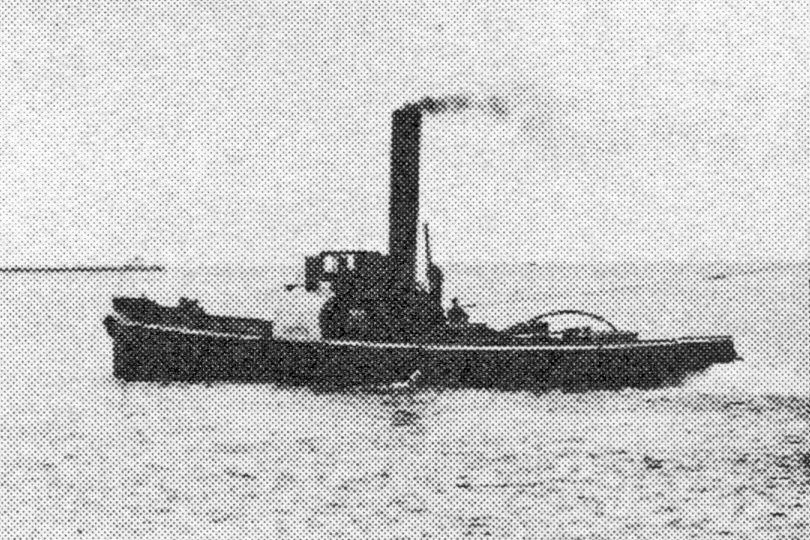

History

Poland
- Name: Castor
- Builder: Kaliningrad (German Empire)
- Launched: 1917
- Commissioned: 1920
- Decommissioned: 1922

History

Poland
- Commissioned: 1922
- Decommissioned: 1939

History

Nazi Germany
- Commissioned: 1939
- Decommissioned: 1945

History

Poland
- Commissioned: 1945
- Decommissioned: 1955
- Fate: scrapped in 1958

General characteristics
- Displacement: capacity: 63 GRT; deadweight: 10 NRT
- Length: 27.8 m (91 ft 2 in)
- Beam: 4.7 m (15 ft 5 in)
- Draft: 1.2 m (3 ft 11 in)
- Propulsion: steam engine with a power of 160 hp; 1 propeller
- Complement: 5

Castor was a Polish tugboat from the interwar period, initially serving in the Polish Navy and later in civilian service. The vessel was built in 1917 at a German shipyard in Kaliningrad and was purchased by Poland in the spring of 1920. Between 1920 and 1922, it served in the Polish Navy before being transferred to civilian use. During World War II, the tugboat operated under the flag of the Third Reich, but after the war, it returned to Poland. The vessel was decommissioned in 1955 and scrapped in 1958. Castor and Pollux, acquired at the same time, were the first tugboats in the Polish fleet.

== History ==
After Poland took over Pomerania, granted to it by the Treaty of Versailles, which included only two small fishing ports – Hel and Puck – efforts were undertaken to acquire auxiliary floating equipment, as only a certain number of fishing boats, cutters, and merchant sailing ships were taken over. The newly established Polish Navy, which was to receive six former German torpedo boats by the decision of the Conference of Ambassadors, particularly needed tugboats to assist in guiding vessels into the tight harbor basin of the provisional port in Puck and to manage the shallow fairway through the shoals of Bay of Puck.

In April and May 1920, the Department of Maritime Affairs of the Ministry of Military Affairs purchased a large number of floating units in Gdańsk, including two tugboats, Castor and Pollux. These were the first tugboats in the Polish Navy.

Castor was likely built in 1917 at an unspecified German shipyard in Kaliningrad. (Note: Neumann (2013, p. 188) and Piaskowski (1996, p. 57) state that the tugboat was built in 1919, which was also indicated by the magazine Morze in issue 2/3 from 1930. However, the last owner, E. Grycmacher, claimed that the tugboat was built in 1916 by the E. Schichau shipyard in Elbląg (Huras & Twardowski (2002, p. 184)).) The name of the vessel referred to Castor, the mythical son of Zeus and Leda, and the twin brother of Pollux.

== Technical specifications ==
Castor was a flat-bottomed river-port tugboat with an overall length of 27.8 meters, a beam of 4.7 meters, and a draught of 1.2 meters. (Note: Neumann (2013, p. 189) states that the draft was 0.9 meters, while Piaskowski (1996, p. 57) states it was 1 meter.) The hull depth was 1.6 meters. The vessel had a gross tonnage of 63 BRT and a deadweight tonnage of 10 NRT. Its power plant consisted of a two-cylinder compound steam engine with an output of 160 hp, driving a single propeller. (Note: Huras & Twardowski (2002, p. 184) state that the engine power was 140 hp.)

The crew consisted of five people: a skipper and four sailors.

== Service ==
=== Navy ===
Castor was transferred to the navy in 1920, assigned by order No. 39 of the Ministry of Military Affairs from May 22 to the Coastal Command in Puck. The home port of the tugboat became Puck. Its main tasks included servicing dredgers and scows working in the Bay of Puck (dredging the "Depka" passage in Rybitwia Shallow) and in the port basins of Puck and Hel. Due to its small dimensions and flat bottom, the vessel could only be used in the waters of the Gdańsk Bay in good weather.

Due to the division of maritime affairs into civilian and military, Castor and Pollux were removed from the list of auxiliary naval units on 1 January 1922 and transferred to the Commercial Navy Office in Wejherowo, which was under the authority of the Polish Merchant Navy in the Ministry of Industry and Trade.

=== Civilian service until 1939 ===
Despite the change in affiliation, the tugboat's task remained the same: servicing dredgers and barges in the Bay of Puck, as well as maintaining communication between the port of Puck and the under-construction Port of Gdynia. During the summer season, when there were no specialized excursion vessels, Castor and Pollux carried official delegations and tourists, mainly to Hel. From August 1923, both vessels performed towing and piloting tasks, assisting passenger ships and colliers docking at the makeshift pier in the Gdynia port. In 1925, Castor and Pollux were permanently assigned to the Port Captaincy in Gdynia. After the purchase of a modern and much larger tugboat, Ursus, which took over most towing tasks in the Gdynia port, Castor, which could only operate in good weather, was mainly used for piloting ships, servicing dredgers, and transporting tourists. Practical exams for ship captains and fishermen were also held aboard. In 1928, the tugboat was transferred to the jurisdiction of the Maritime Office in Gdynia.

In 1934, the tugboat was permanently assigned to service dredgers working in the Gdańsk Bay near Jastarnia. In 1936, the vessel was deemed unfit for further service and put up for auction. In the spring of 1937, it was purchased for 15,000 PLN by Edward Grycmacher, a long-time employee of the Waterways Authority in Tczew. After undergoing repairs at the Gdańsk Shipyard, the new owner began operating the vessel on the lower and middle Vistula, towing barges on the Gdańsk–Toruń–Włocławek route until the outbreak of the World War II.

=== World War II ===
After the German invasion of Poland, the tugboat was requisitioned in Toruń by the German Water Police and subsequently handed over to the Wehrmacht's engineering units. It continued to operate under the same name, among other tasks, for the reconstruction of bridges destroyed during the September Campaign. In the spring of 1940, while working on a road bridge in Toruń during high water levels, the tugboat sank after striking an underwater obstacle. After being raised, the unit was towed to the Kaiserliche Werft Danzig shipyard for repairs. Since the owner of the tug, Edward Grycmacher, refused to sign the Volksliste, the unit was put up for sale and, in July 1940, was acquired by the Gdańsk shipowner Heinrich Gottemeyer. Castor then participated in towing barges on the Gdańsk–Kaliningrad route, and by the end of the war, it found itself in Hamburg, where it was taken over by the British Tugboat Office in May 1945.

=== Post-war period ===
The unit was located and identified by members of the Polish Maritime Mission, who secured its return from the British authorities. Devastated by the Germans, Castor was repaired under the supervision of its pre-war owner at a Hamburg shipyard. On 20 November 1946, under the command of skipper Maksymilian Weese, it began its journey to Poland along inland waterways, towing the reclaimed barge Maria, which contained equipment from the Wolbrom Rubber Factory. On December 14, the tug reached Ujście, where it was officially handed over to Edward Grycmacher.

After its reclamation, the nationalization of Castor was considered, but due to the tugboat's limited usefulness, it was returned to its owner, who registered the company under the name "S.S. CASTOR holownik, Edward Grycmacher, Gdynia, ul Polna 8". From 1947, the unit operated within the Gdynia port area, servicing lighters and bunkering barges, towing barges loaded with scrap metal from the wreck of the battleship Gneisenau, and escorting fishing boats to refuel. From 1 May 1949, the tugboat was chartered by the Block-Sped company, but after being damaged, the contract was terminated. From 1950 to 1953, Castor remained idle in the Gdynia port, and during the winter of 1953/1954, it was used as a source of central heating for the ship SS Panna Wodna, anchored on the Motława river in Gdańsk, serving as a restaurant. The owner attempted to sell the tugboat, but unsuccessfully. The unused unit deteriorated in the port until the owner's death in 1958, when his heirs handed it over to the Regional Scrap Yard, where Castor was cut up. (Note: The heirs attempted to sell the boiler and steam engine, which were in good technical condition, but due to a lack of interest, they were also scrapped in 1959 (Huras & Twardowski (2002, p. 208)).)

== Bibliography ==
- Huras, Bohdan; Twardowski, Marek (2002). Księga statków polskich: 1918-1945 [The Book of Polish Ships: 1918–1945] (in Polish). Vol. 4. Gdańsk: Polnord. ISBN 83-86181-78-8.
- Neumann, Maciej (2013). Flota II Rzeczypospolitej i jej okręty [The Fleet of the Second Polish Republic and Its Ships] (in Polish). Łomianki: LTW. ISBN 978-83-7565-309-0.
- Piaskowski, Stanisław M. (1996). Okręty Rzeczypospolitej Polskiej 1920–1946. Album planów [Ships of the Republic of Poland 1920–1946: An Album of Plans] (in Polish). Warsaw: Lampart.
