= Mamert Stankiewicz =

Polish naval officer (1889–1939)

Captain Mamert Stankiewicz
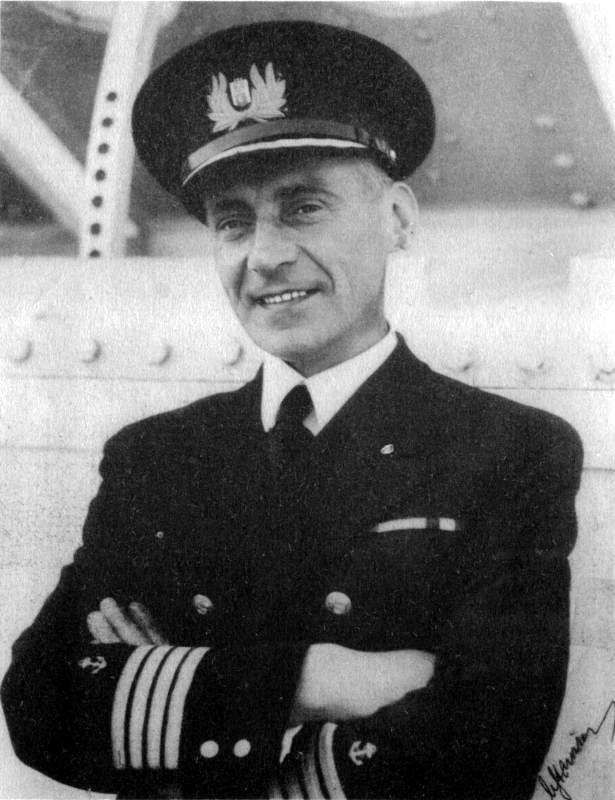
- Mamert Stankiewicz on board M/S Piłsudski
- Nickname: Znaczy Kapitan
- Born: 22 January 1889; Mitau, Courland Governorate, Russian Empire
- Died: 26 November 1939 (aged 50) North Sea
- Allegiance: Poland
- Branch: Imperial Russian Navy; Polish Navy
- Service years: 1900-1939
- Rank: Lieutenant commander Captain (merchant marine)
- Conflicts: World War I World War II
- Awards: Virtuti Militari; Distinguished Service Cross (United Kingdom)
- Other work: writer of maritime history

Mamert Stankiewicz (22 January 1889 – 26 November 1939) was a Polish naval officer of the merchant marine, the commander of Lwów, Polonia and finally captain of the Polish ocean liner Piłsudski, which was incorporated into the UK Royal Navy and converted into the ship transporting British and Polish soldiers during World War II. On 26 November 1939, Pilsudski was torpedoed by German U-boat, and Stankiewicz, after inspecting the entire sinking ship to ensure that there were no sailors and soldiers left behind, and after rescuing sailors and soldiers from the ice-cold Northern Atlantic, died of exhaustion. Stankiewicz's life was immortalized by Karol Olgierd Borchardt, whose series of books on Stankiewicz became a best-seller among Polish maritime books.

== Biography ==
Stankiewicz was born in Mitau in Courland (now Jelgava in Latvia) to a Polish noble family with "Grave" coat of arms. The Stankiewicz Family lived there, after the return from imprisonment in Syberia for the involvement in the January Uprising of 1863 against the occupying Poland the Czar's Russia. He graduated from the Naval Cadet Corps in St. Petersburg and joined the Russian Imperial Navy. During World War I he was initially a navigation officer on board the Russian armoured cruiser Riurik, the flagship of the Baltic Fleet. A successful officer, he was made Chief of Staff of the Baltic Fleet during the first battles in the Gulf of Riga, after which he also briefly served as a commanding officer of one of the Char's Navy battleships.

Dispatched by the Imperial court to the United States, in 1918 he became a naval attache in the Russian consulate in Pittsburgh. However, the following year he returned to Russia and joined the riverine flotilla in Siberia during the Russian Civil War. Arrested by the Cheka, he was imprisoned in Irkutsk and then in a prison camp in Krasnoyarsk. Following the Peace of Riga ending the Polish-Bolshevik War Stankiewicz was a subject of a prisoner of war exchange and was allowed to settle in Poland. Verified in the rank of lieutenant-commander (komandor podporucznik), Stankiewicz joined the newly formed Polish Navy and became a commander of the Navigation Department of the Naval School of Tczew, the first maritime school in Polish history. Soon afterwards he also started his career as a lecturer of navigation and astronomy at the Maritime Officers' School in Toruń.

In 1923 he returned to the high seas as one of the officers on board Lwów, a barque serving as a school ship during her voyage to Brazil. The following year he became the commanding officer of that ship and held that post until 1926, when he left the Polish Navy and joined the merchant marine as a commander of numerous cargo ships and a ship pilot at the Maritime Authority in Gdynia. One of the most experienced captains in the Polish Merchant Marine, in 1931 he became the commanding officer of the prestigious, yet obsolete ocean liners Pułaski and Polonia. About that time he also became a member of the team supervising the design and construction of a modern ocean liner, the Piłsudski.

When she was completed in 1935, Stankiewicz became her first commanding officer. The ship, being the most modern ship in the Polish merchant marine and among the most luxurious European ocean liners, made numerous voyages from Poland and Constanţa in Romania to Palestine, Brazil, Canada, United Kingdom and the United States. M/S Piłsudski commenced her last voyage as an ocean liner on a Gdynia – Copenhagen – Halifax – New York City route on 11 August 1939. However, she was caught on the high seas by the outbreak of the World War II. She was then commandeered by the Polish Navy, renamed ORP Piłsudski and moved to a shipyard in northern England, where she was turned into a troopship.

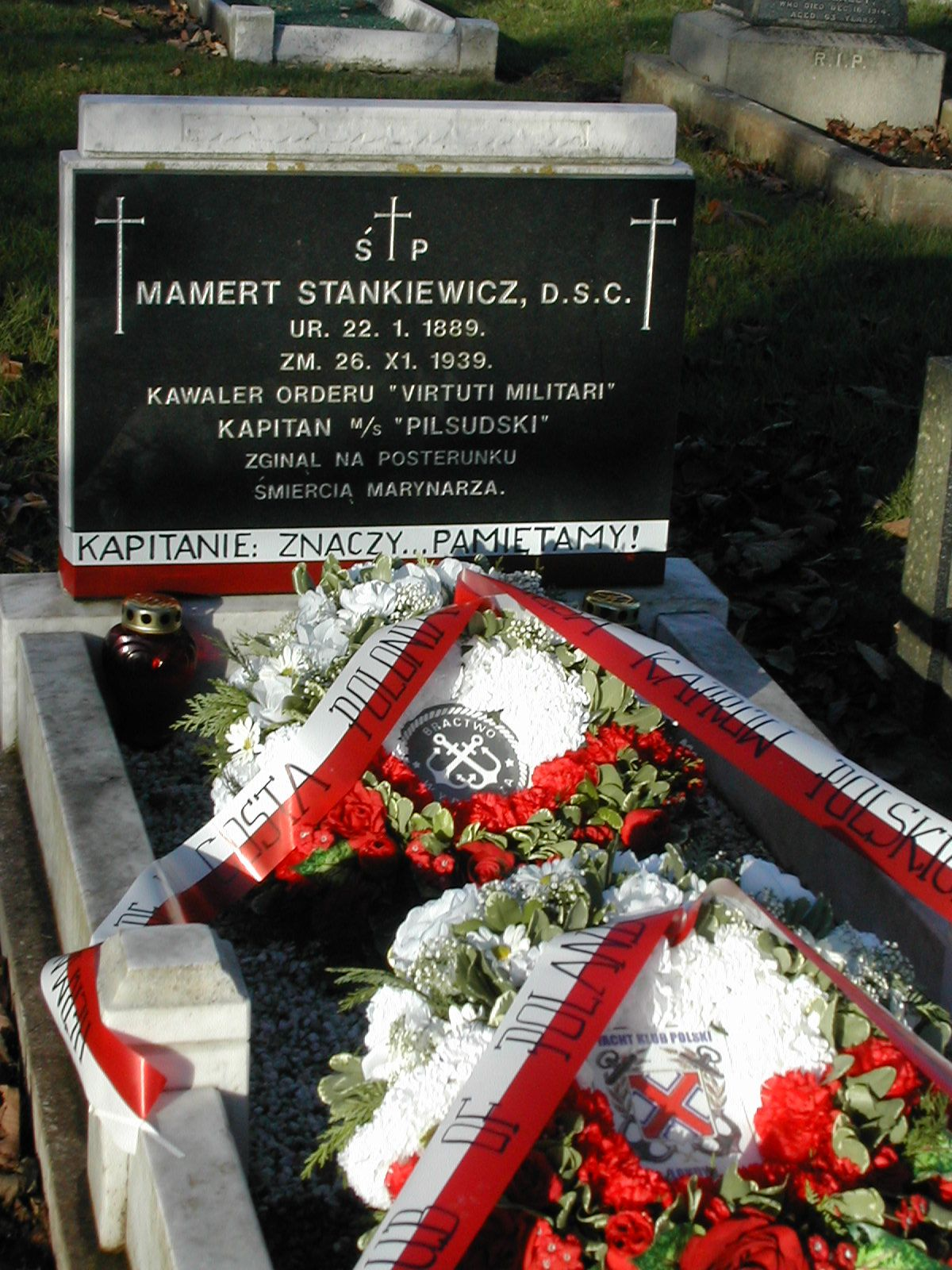
Grave of Mamert Stankiewicz in Hartlepool, 2005

However, on 26 November 1939, during her maiden voyage in the new role, the Australia-bound ORP Piłsudski was struck by two explosions from German torpedoes and sank not far from Newcastle and Kingston-upon-Hull. Captain Mamert Stankiewicz was the last to leave the ship as he wanted to ensure that all of Piłsudski's crew and were safe and no sailors and soldiers were left behind on the sinking ship. He rescued several sailors and soldiers and protected their safety on the lifeboats, while himself immersed in ice-cold Northern Atlantic. The sailors, soldiers, and Captain Stankiewicz were finally rescued by a British ship. He died of exhaustion and hypothermia.

Stankiewicz was buried with full military honours in Hartlepool near Middlesbrough. He was posthumously awarded with the Virtuti Militari for bravery on the battlefield with the highest Polish military decoration (being the only merchant fleet captain so decorated), and the British Distinguished Service Cross. In 1962 the general cargo vessel MS Kapitan M. Stankiewicz was named after him. His elder brother Jan (known as 'the Bull'), was also a captain of Polish Merchant Marine. His younger brother Roman was the officer of Polish Navy, in the rank of commander, who led in "Blyskawica" the three Polish destroyers on their way from Poland to Britain in August 1939. Roman Stankiewicz died exactly a year after Mamert, on 26 November 1940 in the Polish/French patrol vessel "Medoc".

== Family ==
He was married to Helena (née Jankowska). They had four daughters: Zofia (died in Siberia), Anna (primo voto Tomaszewska, who fought in the Warsaw Uprising in the Polish Home Army, formation "Gustaw"), Irena (primo voto Malecka, who fought and was wounded in the Warsaw Uprising in the Polish Home Army, formation "Tower"), Janina (killed in the Warsaw Uprising).

== His nickname ==
Already during his lifetime Stankiewicz became known to his crew as Znaczy Kapitan, which could be roughly translated as 'That is' Captain, a nickname coined after Stankiewicz's habit of starting almost every sentence with the word znaczy (literally It means, idiomatically That is / I mean / You mean). The nickname also became the title of Karol Olgierd Borchardt's first book on Stankiewicz.
