= Lwów (ship) =

1868 Polish sailing ship

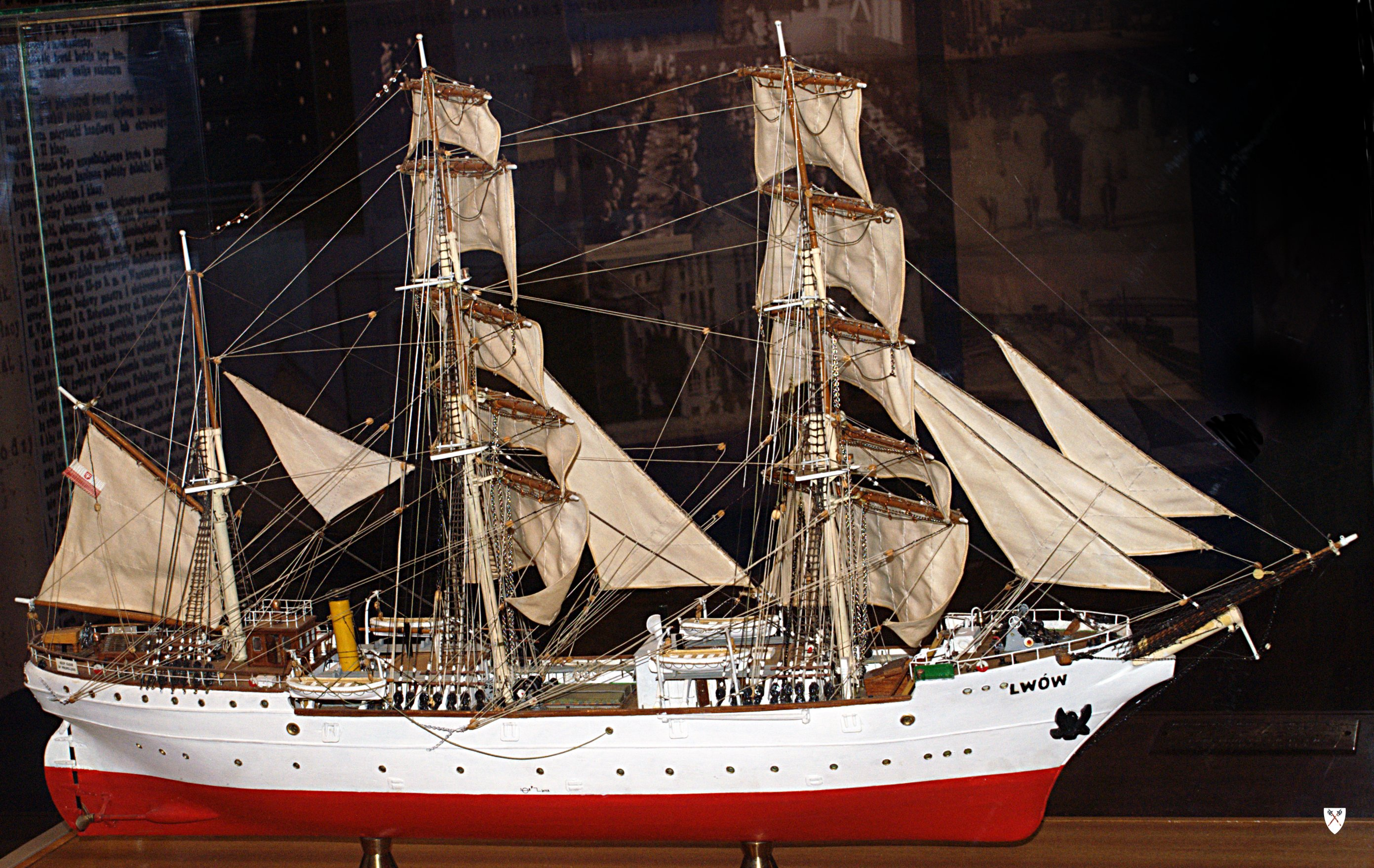
- Model of Lwów

History

United Kingdom
- Name: Chinsura
- Namesake: Chinsura
- Owner: Thomas & Brocklenbank
- Operator: G. R. Cloover and Co.
- Launched: 25 April 1868
- Fate: Sold, 1893

Italy
- Name: Lucco
- Owner: Fratelli Olvarii, Camogli
- Acquired: 1893
- Fate: Sold, 1898

Netherlands
- Name: Nest
- Owner: P. Landberg & Zoon
- Acquired: 1898
- Fate: Sold, 1920

Poland
- Name: Lwów
- Namesake: Lwów
- Acquired: 1920
- Commissioned: 4 September 1921
- Decommissioned: 25 September 1937
- Fate: Scrapped, 1938

General characteristics
- Type: School ship
- Tonnage: 1,293 GRT; 964 NRT
- Length: 85.1 m (279 ft 2 in) o/a; 64.8 m (212 ft 7 in) p/p
- Beam: 11.4 m (37 ft 5 in)
- Draught: 6.9 m (22 ft 8 in)
- Installed power: 2 × 8 hp (6 kW) auxiliary (110 volt) engines
- Propulsion: 2 × 4-cylinder 180 hp (134 kW) diesel engines; 2 × shafts
- Sail plan: Full-rigged ship; 1,500 m^{2} (16,000 sq ft) sail area
- Complement: 35 + 140 students

Lwów was the first officially registered Polish sailing-ship. Launched in 1868 in Birkenhead, England, as frigate Chinsura, from 1883 she was named Lucco; then until 1920, Nest. Since 1920 she was under the Polish banner. Named Lwów, after the third biggest city of the Second Polish Republic, she cruised the whole world in the 1920s, being the first ship under Polish banner to have crossed the Equator, during a cruise to Brazil in 1923. She was also the first Polish training ship. Her notable captains included Mamert Stankiewicz.

She was eventually replaced as the Polish training ship by the newer Dar Pomorza. She was briefly used as a hulk by Polish Navy; retired in 1938, and was scrapped soon afterwards in the Baltic Sea port of Gdynia. Captain and marine writer Karol Olgierd Borchardt named Lwów "The cradle of navigators of the Polish Navy".

== Under British, Italian and Dutch flags ==
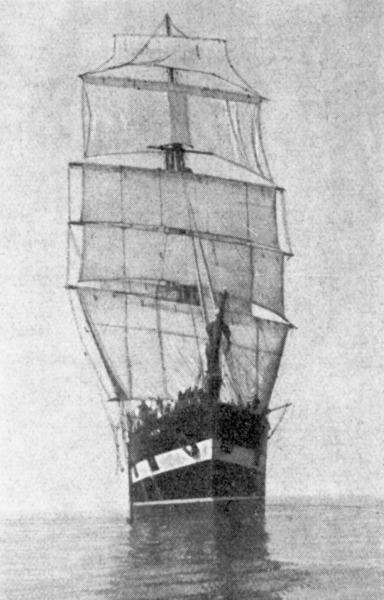
Lwów

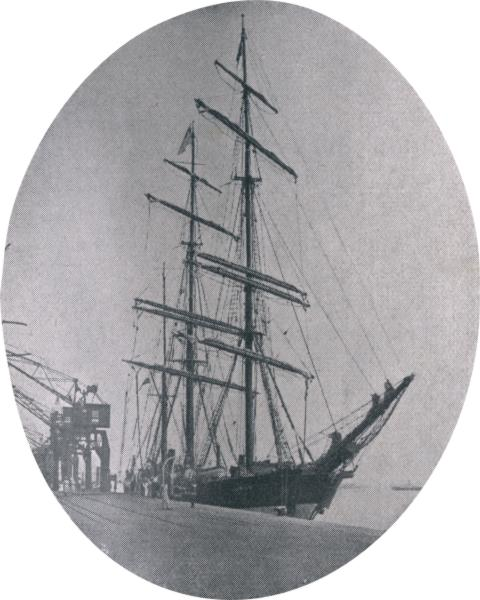
In Rio de Janeiro.

Little is known about the fate of the British frigate Chinsura. Made of iron, she was launched on 25 April 1868 in Birkenhead, by Clover and Royle yard, and belonged to T. & J. Brocklenbank, a company from Liverpool.

Her total length was 85.1 meters, with a beam of 11.4 meters and a draught of 6.9 meters. Speed was 12.5 knots, propulsion being provided by sails together with two Kromhout engines (added in early 1920s). She sailed on routes from Great Britain to India and Australia, carrying goods and passengers.

In 1893 the Chinsura was bought by the Italian company Fratelli Olvarii from Camogli, the name being changed to Lucco. Under that name, she served for only five years, as in 1898 she was caught by a huge storm near the Cape of Good Hope, in which it lost masts and almost sank. Nevertheless, the Lucco reached Durban, where she was refitted and soon afterwards purchased by P. Landberg & Zoon, a Dutch charterer from Batavia, which gave her yet another name, Nest.

In 1915, after serving for several years in southeastern Asia, the Nest came to the Netherlands, where she was anchored in Vlaardingen near Rotterdam and remained inactive.

== Under Polish colours ==
Some time in mid-1920, the Nest was noticed by a Polish commission under Captain Gustaw Kanski, who was the inspector of State Marine School in Tczew. Kanski liked the well-preserved, 51-year-old ship and arranged the purchase. After repairs, made by a private company of brothers Van der Windt from Vlaardingen, in July 1921, she came to Tczew (the seaport of Gdynia did not exist yet) and was renamed Lwów, becoming Poland's first training ship. Her first captain was Tadeusz Bonifacy Ziolkowski, an experienced sailor, who had served in the German Navy during World War I.

On 4 September 1921, after a special ceremony, the Lwów officially became part of the freshly created Polish Navy. Her banner was funded by women living in the city of Lwów, and she was handed to Captain Ziolkowski by President of the city of Lwów, dr. Stahl. Among other captains were Mamert Stankiewicz (1924–1926) and Konstanty Maciejewicz (1926–1930).

=== First years ===
Between 1921 and 1929, Lwów did not only serve as a training ship, but also carried goods, to provide funds for her existence. Lwów served on several lines, cruising the Baltic Sea, the North Sea, Black Sea, Atlantic Ocean and the Mediterranean. On 13 August 1923, she was the first ship under Polish banner to cross the Equator, during a cruise to Brazil. Until 1927, she was intensely exploited, as only then the Poles purchased additional ships from France, including the Wilno and the Wilia (the latter one transported remains of Juliusz Słowacki to Gdynia and was escorted by the Lwów).

=== Late years ===
In 1929 Lwów went on her last cruise, to Hanko in Finland and then returned to Gdynia, to be replaced with Dar Pomorza. The banner was moved during a special ceremony on 13 July 1930, together with whole crew and some parts of equipment.

The ship was transferred to the Polish Navy, which used her as a hulk for crews of submarines. Several navy enthusiasts suggested that Lwów, regarded as a legendary ship, should be preserved as a monument or a museum. However, these wishes were not fulfilled. On 25 September 1937, she was erased from the Lloyd's Register. In early 1938 the ship was retired and scrapped in May of that year in Gdynia. According to other sources, she survived until the beginning of World War II, and only then was scrapped by the Germans. It has been estimated that the ship altogether crossed almost 65,000 nautical miles (120,000 km; 75,000 mi).

== See also ==
- List of large sailing vessels
