= Karol Olgierd Borchardt =

Polish writer and captain (1905–1986)

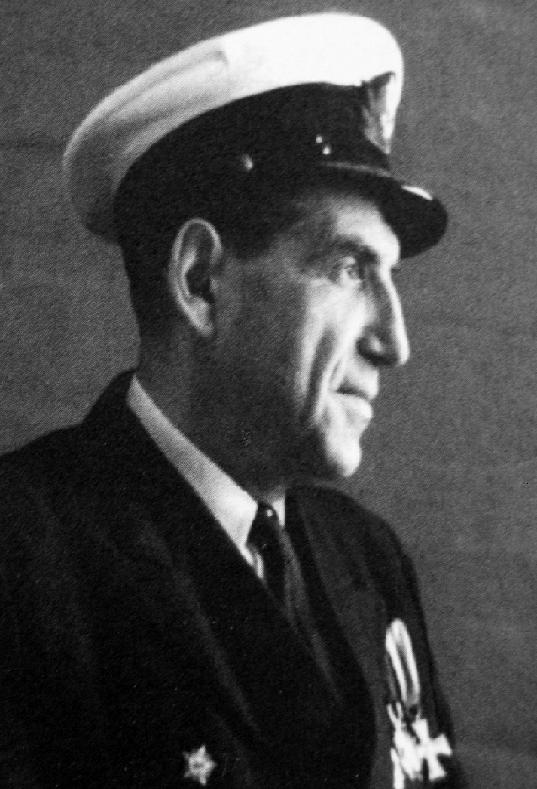
- Born: March 25, 1905; Moscow, Russian Federation
- Died: May 20, 1986 (aged 81); Gdynia, Poland
- Occupations: Writer and captain in the Polish Merchant Marine
- Known for: Mariner and author
- Notable work: Znaczy Kapitan
- Spouse: Karolina Borchardt (married 1928)
- Children: Danuta Borchardt-Stachiewicz
- Awards: Cross of Valour (1920, 1941)
- Honours: STS Kapitan Borchardt

Karol Olgierd Borchardt (25 March 1905 – 20 May 1986) was a Polish writer and a captain in the Polish Merchant Navy. He was twice awarded the Polish Cross of Valor for heroism and survived the sinking of both the m/v Piłsudski and the m/v Chrobry during the Second World War. He wrote maritime-themed short stories and worked in the Polish merchant marine service before and during the Second World War.

== Biography ==
Karol Olgierd Borchardt was born on May 25, 1905, in Moscow. He spent his early years in Paris. When it was time for him to begin school, his mother, Maria Borchardt (née Raczkiewiczówna) wished him to have a Polish education. She brought him to Vilnius, which was part of Poland at the time.

=== Merchant marine ===
Borchardt's first application to the maritime school in Tczew was declined due to medical reasons in 1924, although he was accepted to the maritime school the year after. After training, he took a reserve officer course at the Navy Cadet School in Toruń, but was later forced to resign due to an injury he had sustained at the age of 15 in the Polish-Soviet war.

Borchardt served in the Polish Merchant Marine as an officer on transatlantic liners and training sail ships. On 28 December 1928 he married Karolina Iwaszkiewicz, the first woman from Poland to earn a pilot's license. In 1929 Karol and Karolina welcomed their daughter Danuta.

In 1938, Borchardt was named commandant of the Maritime School sailing ship in Gdynia "Dar Pomorza".

=== Wartime service ===
During World War II, he served on two Polish liners converted into troop transports, the m/v Piłsudski and the m/v Chrobry. He survived the sinkings of both, earning his second Cross of Valour for rescuing the crew of the Chrobry.

=== United Kingdom ===
In 1943, Borchardt was reunited with his wife and daughter in London, where he worked for British shipping lines and directed a Polish maritime school. After the war, he was determined to return to Poland, his wife Karolina would remain in Great Britain. In 1949, the couple separated, but did not divorce. That year, Karol Borchardt returned to care for his mother in Poland and never saw his wife again.

=== Return to Poland ===
Upon his return to Poland, he became a 1st Class Officer on the MS Batory, and trained Polish naval officers.

He later gained recognition as a writer and chronicler of Polish passenger liners.

Borchardt died in 1986. His remains are buried in Gdynia.

== Works ==
Beginning in the 1960s, Borchardt wrote short stories with maritime themes, which were first published in magazines and later compiled into books. Borchardt's published works include Znaczy kapitan (1960), Krążownik spod Somosierry (1963) and Szaman Morski (1968).

His book Znaczy Kapitan is a collection of short stories published in 1960 and was inspired by Captain Mamert Stankiewicz. In the book Borchardt details his experiences on the ships Lwów and Dar Pomorza and with the Polish Navy. His daughter Danuta Borchardt-Stachiewicz would later translate it into English.

He wrote a book on two "cradles" of Polish seadogs, the two sail-training vessels, Lwów and the Dar Pomorza.

The book Szaman morski tells the tales of Eustazy Borkowski. The title refers to one of Captain Borkowski's nicknames: translated as "sea shaman". Two of his books were published posthumously: Pod czerwoną rózą and Kolebka nawigatorów.

== Achievements and legacy ==
In his lifetime, Borchardt was awarded:

- Cross of Valour (1920 and 1941)
- Cross of Merit (1957)
- Medal of Ministry of National Education of the Republic of Poland (1970)
- Gdynia's President Prize (1974)

Kapitan Borchardt, a Polish sail training three-masted gaff schooner, in service since 2011, is named after Karol Olgierd Borchardt. The Karol Olgierd Borchardt Foundation was founded in the same year and has been a Public Benefit Organisation since 2014. Several schools have been named after him.
