= Seal Sanctuary in Hel =

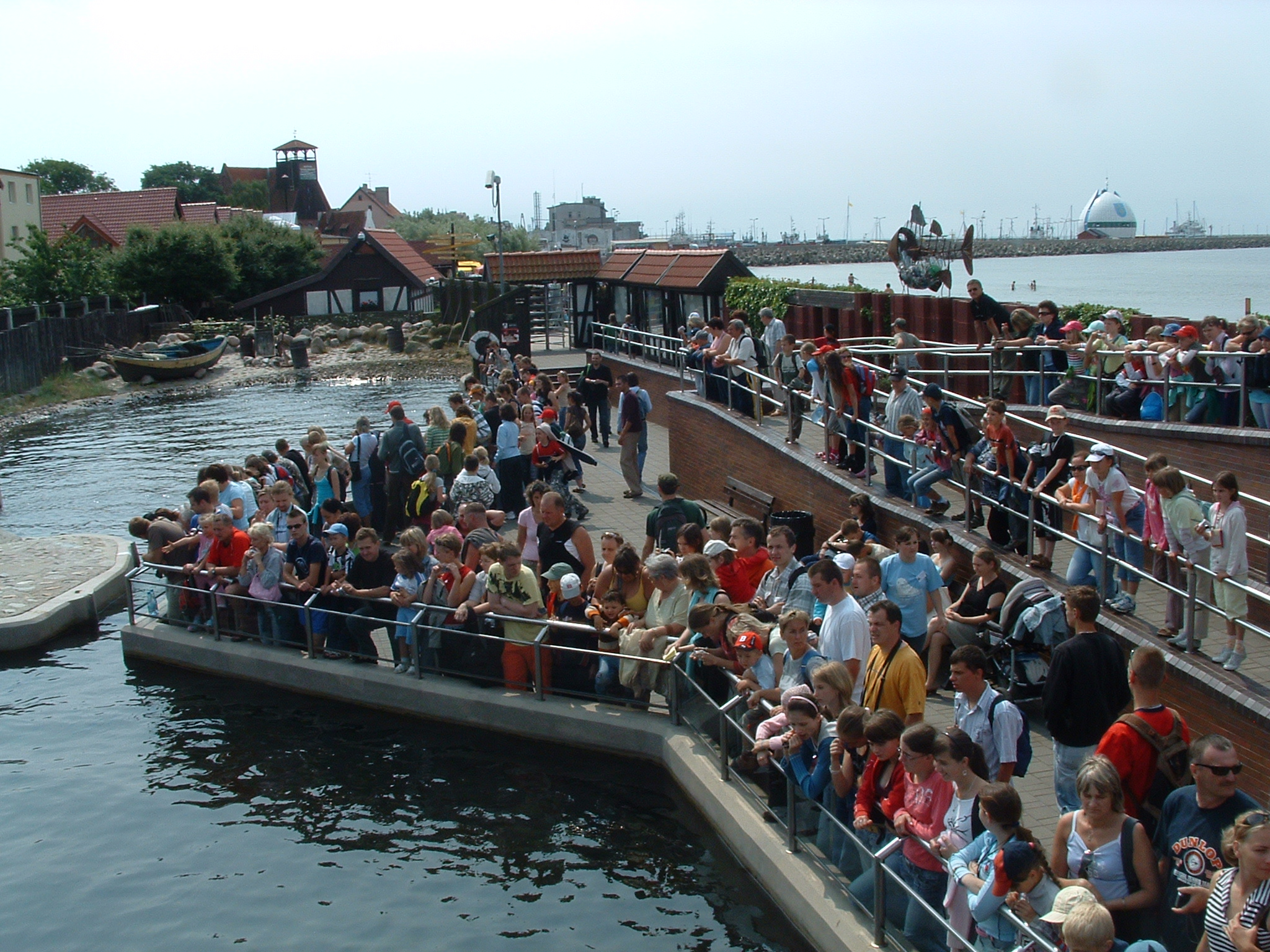
- Seal Sanctuary
- Interactive map of Seal Sanctuary in Hel
- 54.6069411°N 18.8000536°E
- Location: Hel, Poland
- Website: www.fokarium.pl

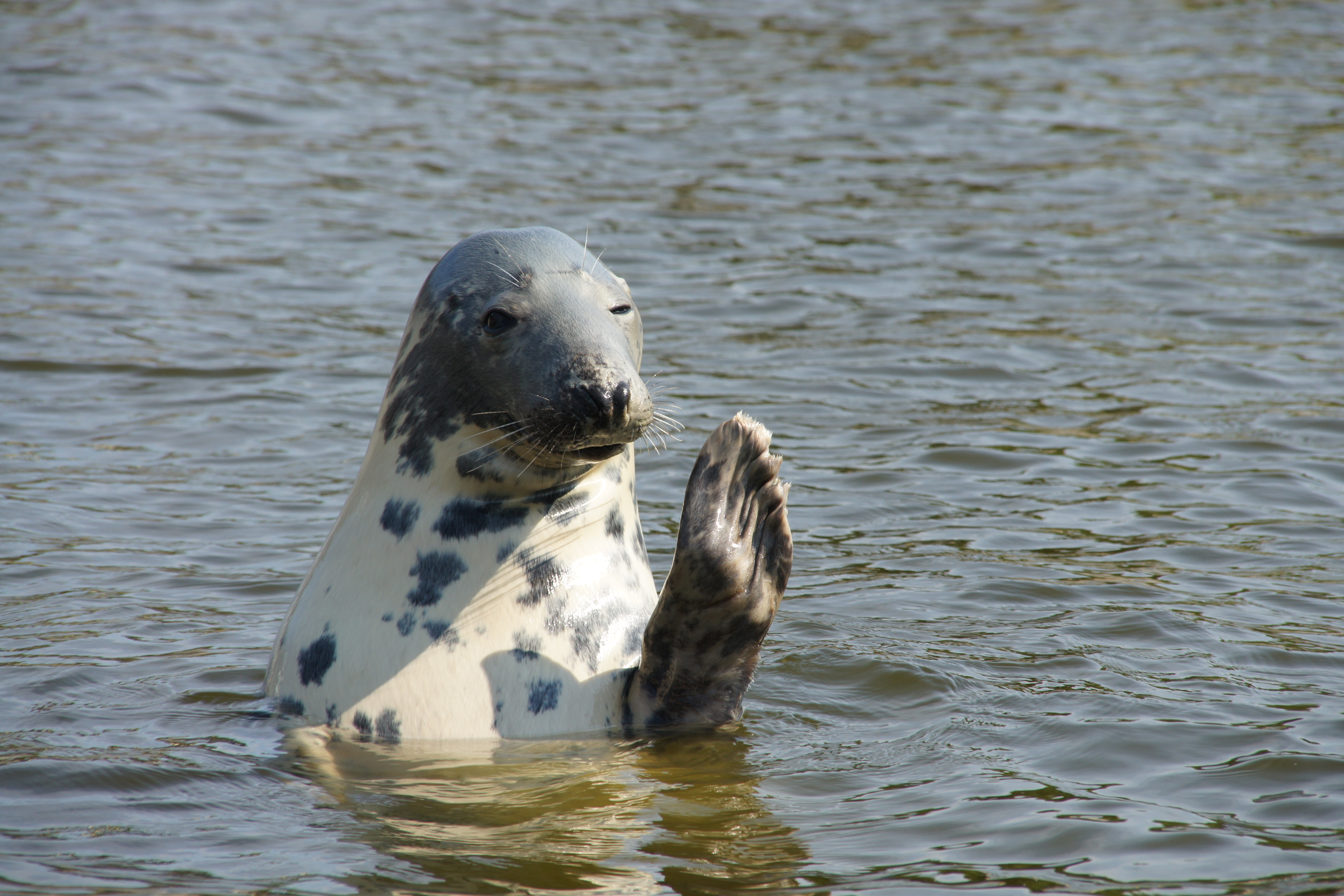
Seal Sanctuary in Hel

The Seal Sanctuary in Hel (Fokarium w Helu) is a public aquarium in the town of Hel at the Polish seaside of the Baltic Sea.

It is not typically commercial enterprise (neither zoo nor circus with some trained animals). It belongs to Oceanography Institute of Gdańsk University and its main goal is to protect the Baltic seals and to promote the knowledge about them and environment protection.

The best time to visit the centre is the seal feeding time when you can see a seal show, currently at 11:00, 12:30 and 14:00.

A caveat: tickets can only be purchased on-site from a ticket machine, so you'll have to wait in a fairly long line.
