= MS Piłsudski =

Polish passenger ship sunk off the Yorkshire coast

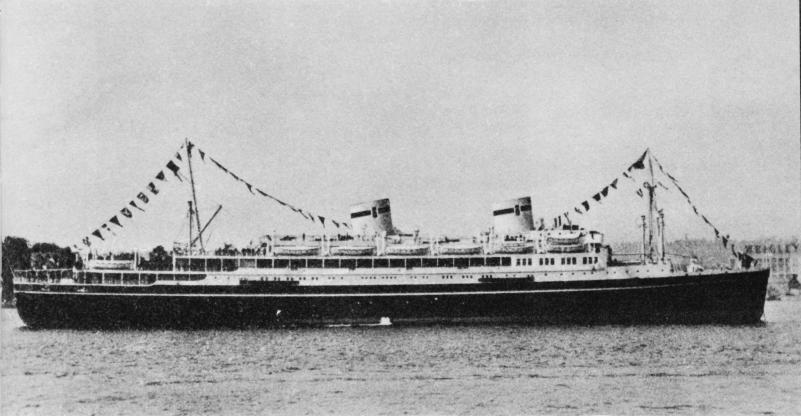
- MS Piłsudski at New York

History

Poland
- Name: Pilsudski
- Namesake: Józef Piłsudski
- Owner: PTTO
- Port of registry: Gdynia, Poland
- Builder: CRDA, Monfalcone
- Yard number: 1126
- Launched: 19 December 1934
- Maiden voyage: 15 September 1935
- Out of service: 1939
- Identification: Call sign: SPED
- Fate: Sunk, 26 November 1939
- Notes: sister ship to MS Batory

General characteristics
- Type: Ocean liner
- Tonnage: 14,294 GRT
- Length: 162 m (531 ft 6 in)
- Beam: 21.6 m (70 ft 10 in)
- Propulsion: Two diesel engines
- Speed: 18 knots (33 km/h; 21 mph)

MS Piłsudski (later renamed ORP Piłsudski) was a medium-size ocean liner of the Polish Merchant Marine, named for Marshal Józef Piłsudski, a national hero of Poland. While transporting troops, the ship was sunk off the coast of England during World War II.

== History ==
She was built in Italy by the CRDA yard at Monfalcone, yard number 1126, for Polskie Transatlantyckie Towarzystwo Okrętowe ("Polish Transatlantic Shipping Company Limited" or PTTO), which in 1934 became Gdynia – Ameryka Linie Zeglugowe (Gdynia – America Line), with part of the payment being shipments of coal from Poland. The ship was named for Polish national hero, Józef Piłsudski. Launched in December 1934, her tonnage was 14,294 tons gross, with a length of 162 metres (531 ft) and beam of 22 metres (71 ft). She was propelled by two diesel engines driving a pair of propellers giving a speed of 18 knots (33 km/h). She was the older sister ship to Poland's most famous ocean liner, MS Batory. The Pilsudski's first skipper was Master Mariner Mamert Stankiewicz.

She entered the regular service as a liner on the trans-Atlantic route in September 1935, setting sail for a maiden voyage from Gdynia to New York. As a liner, she was very badly damaged by her first ocean storm.

=== War service and wreck ===
In 1939, she was taken over for war service by the Polish Navy and scheduled to be converted into an armed merchant cruiser. The plans of that conversion were dropped, the ship being instead converted into a troop transport ship. During her first wartime voyage on 26 November 1939 sailing out of Newcastle, she struck a naval mine (most likely) or was torpedoed (lack of confirmation in German sources). Abandoned too soon by her crew, quite capable of being saved, she sank off the Humber.

Mamert Stankiewicz remained on the ship until all his crew had safely escaped. He later died of exhaustion and hypothermia.

=== Legacy ===
The wreck is located at 53°45.75′N 0°45.67′E in 34 metres (112 ft). The remains of MS Piłsudski were undiscovered for 40 years. In 2008 Polish divers visited the wreck site to search for answers as to why the ship was sunk.

In the novel Eccentrics, written by W. Kowalewski and published by Marginesy-Publishers in 2015, the main character of the novel - a Polish swingman and dancer born in Lemberg, Fabian Apanowicz, takes part in the last peacetime voyage of the Pilsudski as a member of the ship's band, and after his return to Poland after the war, he tells the story of the unfinished voyage to his six years younger sister Wanda, a dentist in Ciechocinek (cf. W. Kowalewski, Excentrycy/Eccentrics, Marginesy Warsaw 2015, pp. 36–43).

In 2023, the Polish government released ‘MS Piłsudski – the underwater mission’ a film using audio visual technology to recreate the ship in its heydey and tell the story of the ship's demise.

== See also ==
- List of shipwrecks in November 1939
