= STS Kapitan Borchardt =

1918 Polish sail training ship

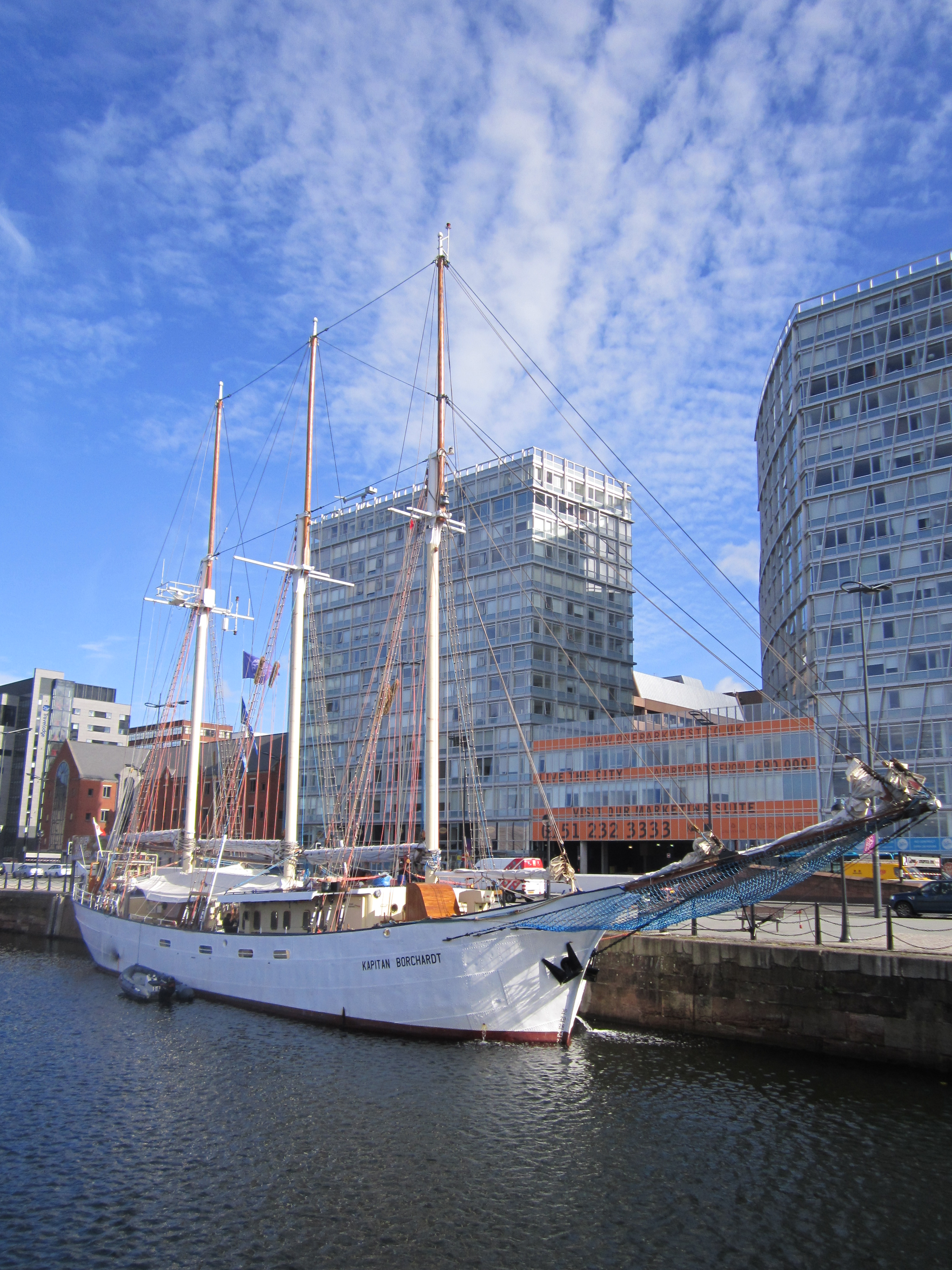
- Kapitan Borchardt in 2012 in Liverpool

History

Poland
- Name: Kapitan Borchardt
- Operator: Skłodowscy Yachting Sp. z o.o. SKA
- Port of registry: Gdańsk
- Builder: J. Patje Waterhuizen
- Launched: 1918
- Renamed: Nora, Harlingen, Moewe, Vadder, Gerrit, In Spe, Utskar, Najaden
- Identification: Call sign : SPG3580; MMSI number: 261020790; IMO number: 5375008
- Status: in active service, as of 2021

General characteristics
- Type: Tall ship
- Tonnage: 173 GT; 90 NT
- Length: 45 m (148 ft) o/a
- Beam: 7 m (23 ft)
- Propulsion: 350 hp (261 kW) Caterpillar 3406B
- Sail plan: Gaff-schooner, sail area: 600 m^{2} (6,500 sq ft)
- Boats & landing craft carried: 1
- Crew: 7 to 60

Kapitan Borchardt is a Polish sail training ship built in 1918, named after Karol Olgierd Borchardt. "Kapitan Borchardt" is the oldest sailing ship currently flying the Polish flag. Launched in the Netherlands in 1918 and named "Nora", the ship was initially used as an ocean-going cargo vessel before being converted to a training ship in Sweden in 1989. Kapitan Borchardt - then named "Najaden" - became a Polish vessel in 2011 when it was purchased from the vessel's former owner.
