= Karolina Borchardt =

Polish artist and pilot

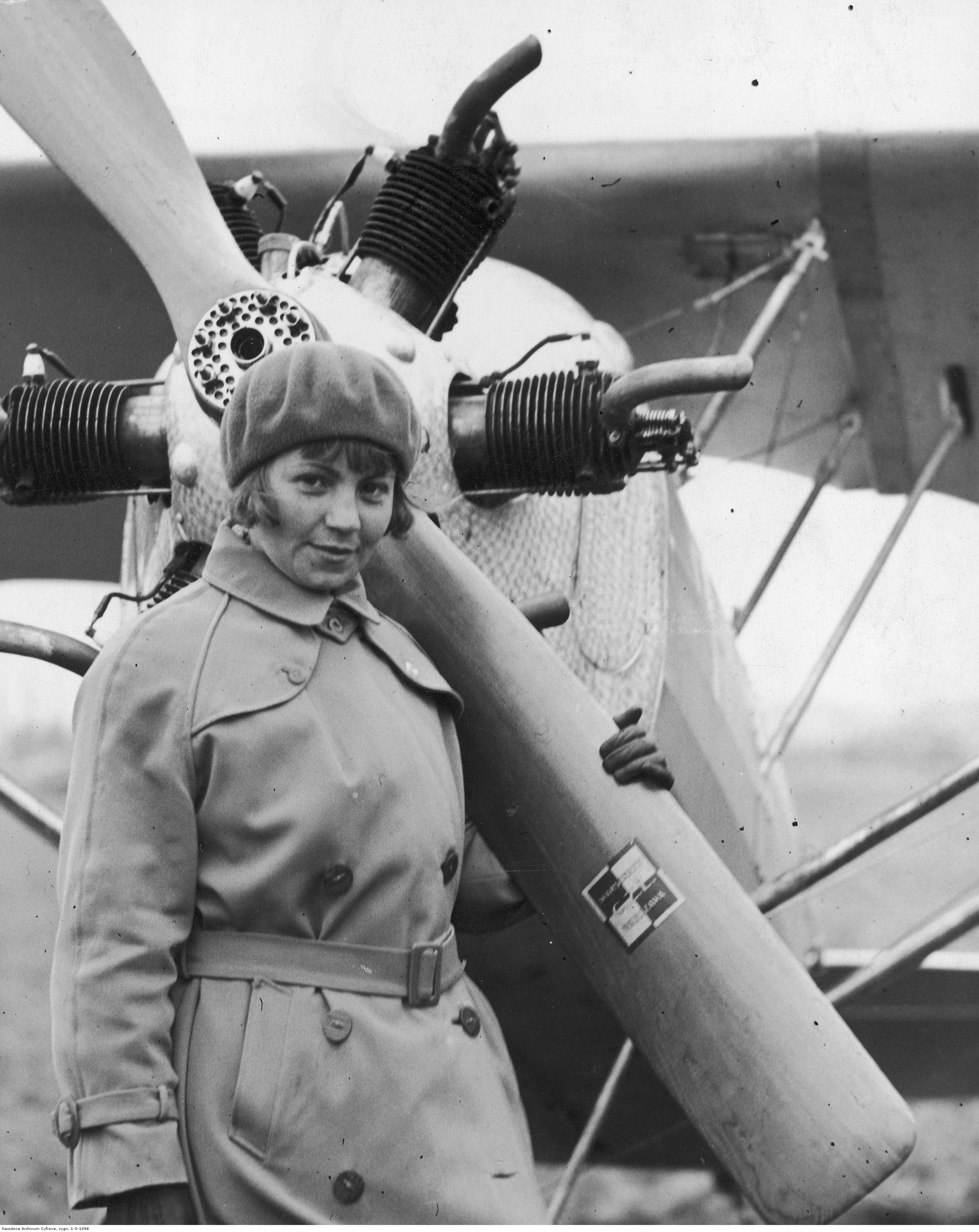
- Born: Karolina Iwaszkiewicz; 26 July 1905; Minsk, Russian Empire
- Died: 17 December 1995 (aged 90); London, United Kingdom
- Education: Krakow University of Economics
- Known for: Early aviator
- Spouse: Karol Olgierd Borchardt (m. 1928)
- Children: Danuta Borchardt-Stachiewicz
- Awards: Knight of the Order of Polonia Restituta, Gold Cross of Merit

Karolina Iwaszkiewicz Borchardt (26 July 1905 – 17 December 1995) was a Polish artist and aviator. She is recognised as one of the first women to earn a pilot's license from Poland. Born in Minsk, Borchardt became a test pilot and was recognised as Polish champion at the 1928 National Light Aircraft competition. Later, she emigrated to the United Kingdom and became a painter of expressionist art.

== Biography ==
Karolina Iwaszkiewicz was born in Minsk on July 26, 1905. Her family belonged to a Polish community living in the then Russian Empire. She went to Vilnius for her high school education. After graduation, Karolina Iwaszkiewicz moved to Kraków to study at the University of Economics. While a student, she began flight training at the Academic Aeroclub of Kraków, where she took theoretical training and later a pilot course. In 1928 she passed her pilot exams and became the first woman in Poland to receive a pilot's license. She completed her first solo flight in an Ansaldo A.300.

In October 1928 she and pilot Józef Bargiel won the title of Polish Champion at the National Light Aircraft Competition. On 26 December 1928, she married Karol Olgierd Borchardt. In 1932, she completed a first-degree pilot course in her new home of Gdynia. In 1939 the Polish Aero Club gifted Borchardt a plane, but her aviation career was cut short by the onset of World War II.

During the war, Borchardt escaped to Sweden and eventually settled in the United Kingdom, where she worked in the Ministry of Foreign Affairs for the Polish government-in-exile. While in London, she later pursued art education and became a proficient artist, painting abstract works that were exhibited across Europe and in New York.

Borchardt died in London in 1995.

== Exhibitions ==
- 1966 – “K. Borchardt”. Barrett Gallery, London, England.
- 1975 – “Karolina Borchardt”. Gallerie Internationale of New York.
- 2015 – "Karolina Borchardt Retrospective". POSK Gallery, London.
- 2017 – “Art Out of the Bloodlands: A Century of Polish Artists in Britain” . Ben Uri Gallery, London
