= Hel, Poland =

Hel
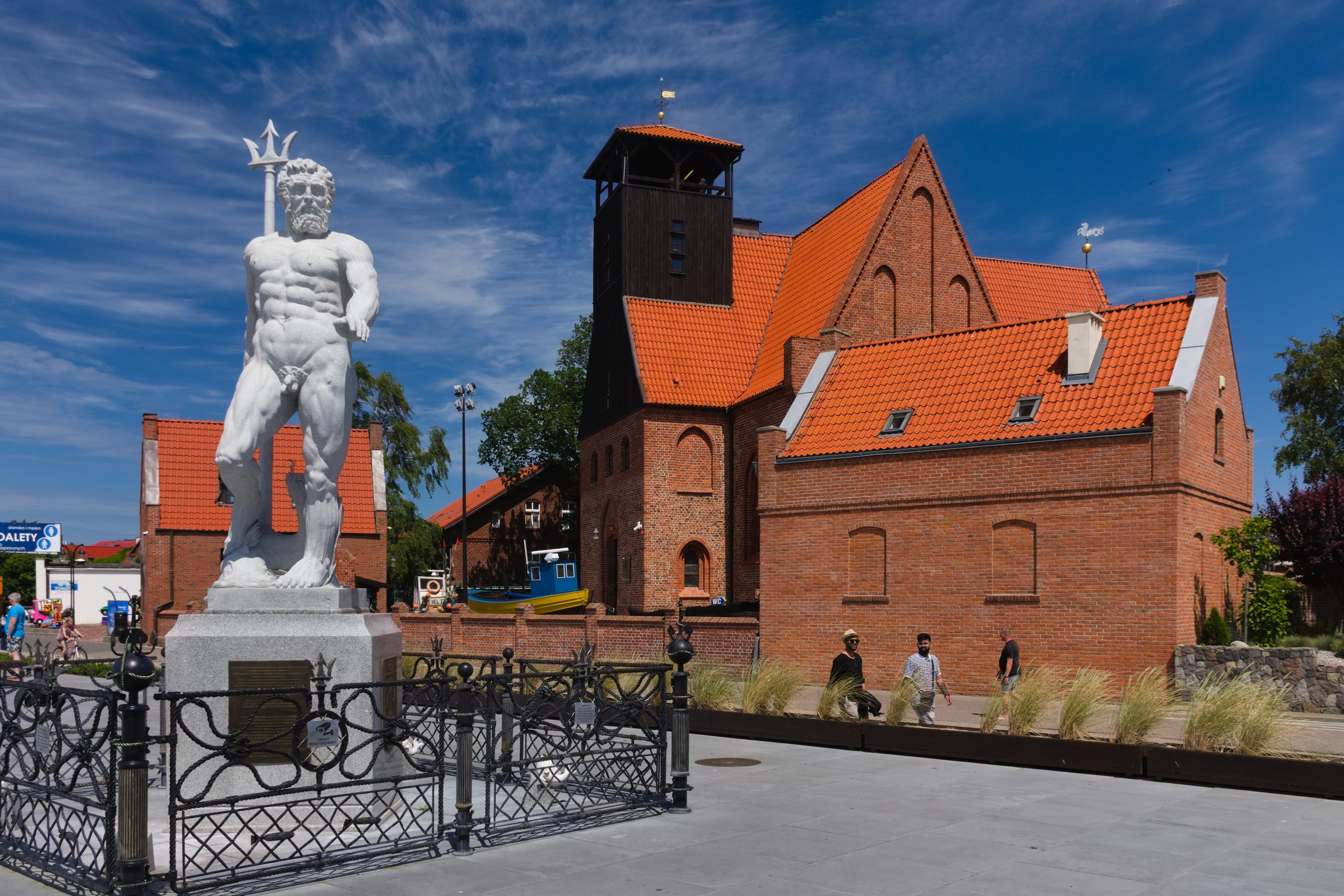
- Neptune fountain and Saints Peter and Paul Church

- Flag Coat of arms

- Location within Poland
- Coordinates: 54°36′42″N 18°48′29″E
- Country: Poland
- Voivodeship: Pomeranian
- County: Puck
- Gmina: Hel (urban gmina)
- Established: 12th century
- Town rights: 1351–1872, 1963

Government
  - Mayor: Mirosław Wądołowski

Area
  - Total: 94.96 km^{2} (36.66 sq mi)

Population (2020)
  - Total: 2,755
  - Density: 29.01/km^{2} (75.14/sq mi)
- Time zone: UTC+1 (CET)
  - Summer (DST): UTC+2 (CEST)
- Postal code: 84-150
- Area code: +48 58
- Car plates: GPU
- Website: https://gohel.pl/

Hel (Note: [xɛl]) (Kashubian: Hél; German: Hela) is a seaside resort city in Puck County, Pomeranian Voivodeship, in northern Poland, located on the tip of the Hel Peninsula, some 33 kilometres (21 miles) from the Polish mainland.

== History ==
=== Early developments ===
The territory became part of the emerging Polish state in the 10th century, under its first historic ruler Mieszko I. The Kashubian village of Hel was first mentioned in 1198 as a centre of herring trade area named Gellen. In one of the Danish chronicles of 1219 it is mentioned that a damaged ship of King Valdemar II the Victorious was set ashore on an "Island of Hel". By the 13th century the village became one of the most important trade centres of the area, competing with the nearby city of Gdańsk. It was then that the village was granted town rights by Duke Świętopełk II the Great of Pomerania. The privileges were again confirmed in 1378 when the town came under the rule of the Teutonic Order.

Initially the town was some 1.5 km (1 mi) from its present-day centre. It contained a church, hospital, city house, two market places, several guest houses and a small port. However, during the 15th century the peninsula started to shrink through marine erosion and soon the town was moved to a safer place. In 1417 St Peter's Church was built in the town, devoted to the patron saint of fishermen. Hel experienced a period of growth, but was later left behind by the faster-growing city of Danzig (Gdańsk). In 1440, the town joined the anti-Teutonic Prussian Confederation, upon the request of which the area was re-incorporated by King Casimir IV Jagiellon into the Kingdom of Poland in 1454. The re-incorporation was confirmed in the 1466 peace treaty, when the Teutonic Knights renounced any claims to the area. In 1466 Casimir IV granted the town as a fief to the city of Gdańsk, which ended the century-long struggle for economic domination over Gdańsk Bay. In 1526 King Sigismund I the Old withdrew all privileges previously granted to Hel and sold the town and the peninsula to the city authorities of Gdańsk. Since then Hel's fate was tied to the fortunes of its bigger neighbour.

In the 17th and 18th centuries prolonged warfare and a series of natural disasters severely damaged the town. It was severely depopulated, and in 1793 it was annexed by Prussia in the Second Partition of Poland. In 1872 the government of the newly formed German Empire abolished the town rights granted to Hel six centuries previously. After that the village of Hela (as it is called in German) lost much of its significance.

=== Modern times ===
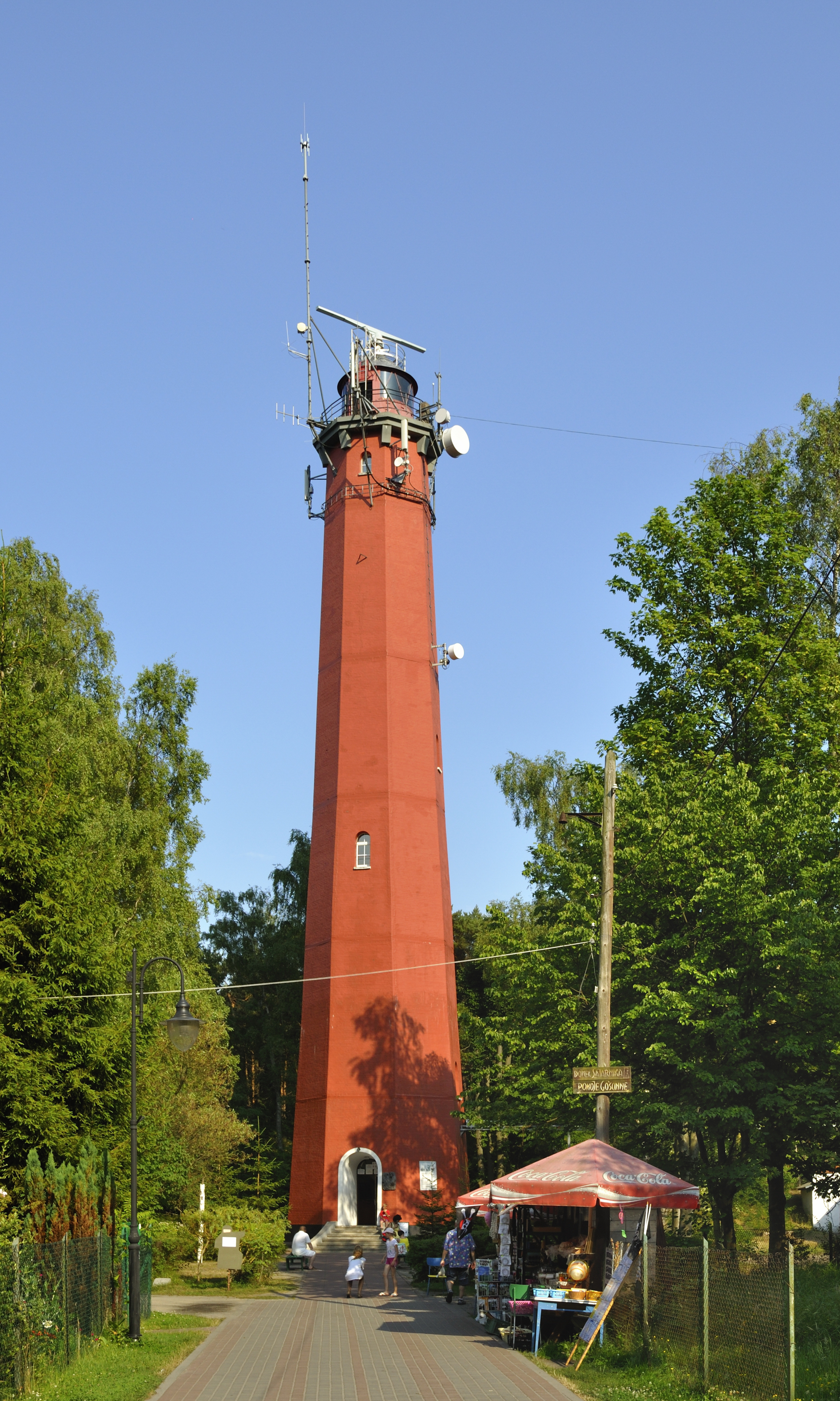
Hel Lighthouse

The period of decline was halted in 1893 when a fishing harbour was built in the village. It provided a shelter for fishing vessels, but also became a popular destination for weekend trips of the inhabitants of Danzig and Zoppot (Sopot). In 1896 the village was granted the status of a sea-side resort.

As a result of World War I and the Treaty of Versailles Poland was re-established as an independent nation. Hel, before the war a predominantly German village (93% in 1905), became again part of Poland. In 1921 a new railway was built along the peninsula connecting the town to the mainland. The authorities of the Pomeranian Voivodeship also planned to build a road to the village, but the peninsula was found too narrow at the time. Soon Hel became one of the most important tourism centres in Polish Pomerania. New suburbs of villas were built for tourists, as well as a new church, school, fishing institute and geophysical observatory. In addition, the village became one of the two main naval bases of the Polish Navy. The harbour was expanded and in 1936 the president declared the peninsula a "Fortified Area" under jurisdiction of the Polish Army. The naval base was expanded significantly and a battery of coastal artillery was built to provide cover for the military facilities.

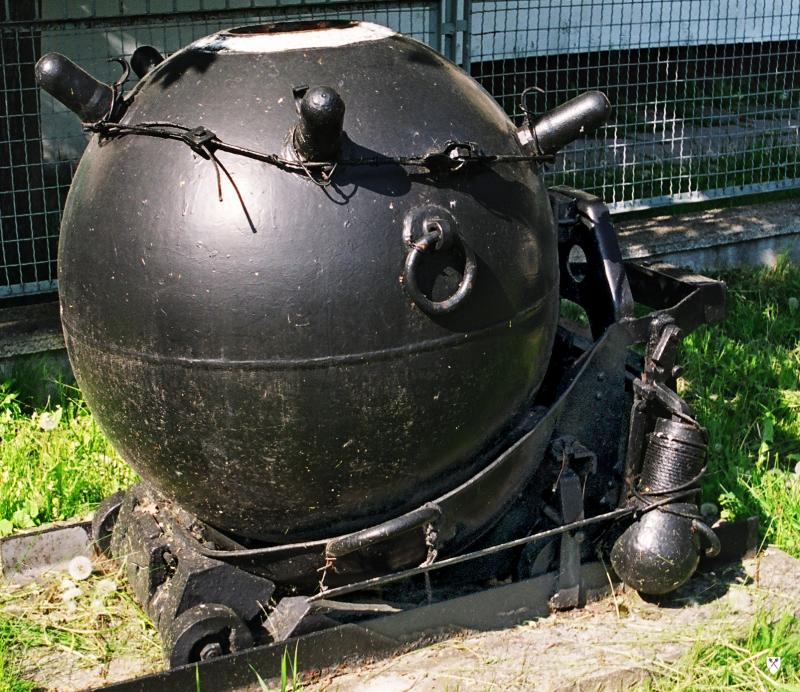
wz. 08/39 naval mine in the open-air museum of naval equipment

During the invasion of Poland, which started World War II in September 1939, the Hel Peninsula was one of the longest-defended pockets of Polish Army resistance. Approximately 3,000 soldiers of the Coastal Defence Group (Grupa Obrony Wybrzeża) units under Kmdr Włodzimierz Steyer defended the area until 2 October 1939. Shortly before capitulation, Polish military engineers detonated a number of torpedo warheads, which separated the peninsula from the mainland, transforming it into an island. Afterwards, Hel was occupied by Germany. Already in 1939, the occupiers carried out the first expulsion of Poles, who were then enslaved as forced labour of new German colonists in various places in the region. During the occupation, the Kriegsmarine used the Hel naval base to train U-boat crews. At the end of the war the village was the last part of Polish soil to be liberated: the German units encircled there only surrendered on 14 May 1945, six days after Germany had capitulated.

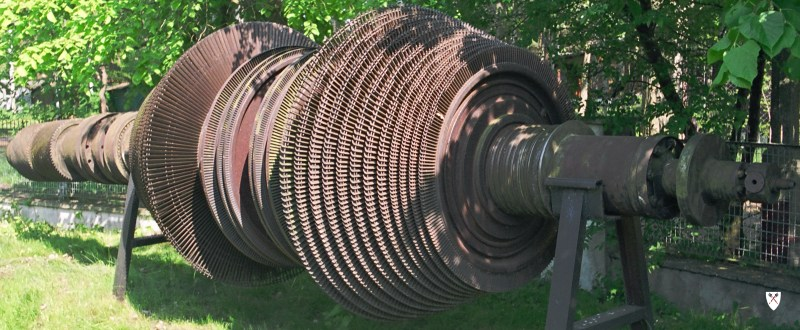
Parsons' turbine from the Polish Navy destroyer ORP Wicher

After the war the village yet again became a naval base. In 1960 a road linking Hel with Jastarnia on the mainland was built. Three years later town rights were reintroduced. Since then the tourist industry started to recover and several hotels, guest houses and inns were built. In 1996 the Polish Navy sold all remaining parts of the peninsula to the civilian authorities and only a small naval base is there today.

The harbour now serves primarily as a yacht marina, though there are some fishing boats and ferries to Gdańsk, Sopot and Gdynia in the summer.

== Sights and culture ==
Hel houses a sea life biological laboratory and there are interesting examples of naval armament and equipment exhibited throughout the town. There is popular beach along the shore between the inner and outer harbour walls, with a seal sanctuary (the Fokarium) just behind it. There is a Fishing Museum that forms part of the National Maritime Museum, Gdańsk in an old church on the sea front.

The most easterly edge of Hel, which was once a military territory, can now be accessed by the general public, making it possible to walk all the way around the peninsula.

Hel is the setting for the Polish crime series Zbrodnia (2014–2015) "The Crime" in English.

== Transport ==
The road leading to the town has been jokingly referred to by tourists and locals as the "highway to Hel". Until 2023 the local summer bus service, run by PKS Gdynia, happened to be numbered 666, which in modern popular culture is a widely recognised symbol for Satan. Due to criticism from religious groups over its associations with the number of the beast, the service was renumbered 669 in 2023. Then, in 2026, the operator FlixBus announced the return of a service numbered 666, a 13-hour route from Kraków through Warsaw to Hel.

== Climate ==
Hel has an oceanic climate (Köppen: Cfb). Its peninsular location generates a unique climate for Poland, which is more similar to the northwest of Europe.

Climate data for Hel (Hel Lighthouse), elevation: 1 m, 1991–2020 normals, extremes 1951–present
Month	Jan	Feb	Mar	Apr	May	Jun	Jul	Aug	Sep	Oct	Nov	Dec	Year
Record high °C (°F)	12.6 (54.7)	12.9 (55.2)	20.5 (68.9)	26.2 (79.2)	28.0 (82.4)	31.7 (89.1)	35.0 (95.0)	31.8 (89.2)	28.1 (82.6)	23.2 (73.8)	15.9 (60.6)	11.7 (53.1)	35.0 (95.0)
Mean maximum °C (°F)	7.1 (44.8)	7.1 (44.8)	12.1 (53.8)	19.3 (66.7)	23.7 (74.7)	26.8 (80.2)	28.0 (82.4)	27.4 (81.3)	22.9 (73.2)	17.2 (63.0)	11.5 (52.7)	8.3 (46.9)	29.2 (84.6)
Mean daily maximum °C (°F)	2.1 (35.8)	2.6 (36.7)	5.6 (42.1)	11.0 (51.8)	16.0 (60.8)	19.7 (67.5)	22.1 (71.8)	22.1 (71.8)	17.6 (63.7)	12.0 (53.6)	7.0 (44.6)	3.7 (38.7)	11.8 (53.2)
Daily mean °C (°F)	0.6 (33.1)	0.7 (33.3)	2.7 (36.9)	6.7 (44.1)	11.4 (52.5)	15.4 (59.7)	18.1 (64.6)	18.2 (64.8)	14.5 (58.1)	9.7 (49.5)	5.3 (41.5)	2.2 (36.0)	8.8 (47.8)
Mean daily minimum °C (°F)	−1.1 (30.0)	−1.1 (30.0)	0.2 (32.4)	3.2 (37.8)	7.6 (45.7)	11.8 (53.2)	14.8 (58.6)	15.1 (59.2)	11.9 (53.4)	7.6 (45.7)	3.7 (38.7)	0.6 (33.1)	6.2 (43.2)
Mean minimum °C (°F)	−8.5 (16.7)	−7.5 (18.5)	−5.4 (22.3)	−2.2 (28.0)	1.4 (34.5)	6.2 (43.2)	10.4 (50.7)	10.5 (50.9)	7.0 (44.6)	2.0 (35.6)	−1.8 (28.8)	−5.8 (21.6)	−10.7 (12.7)
Record low °C (°F)	−19.1 (−2.4)	−20.0 (−4.0)	−17.0 (1.4)	−9.0 (15.8)	−5.1 (22.8)	−0.1 (31.8)	5.4 (41.7)	5.3 (41.5)	−2.3 (27.9)	−3.0 (26.6)	−9.2 (15.4)	−15.2 (4.6)	−20.0 (−4.0)
Average precipitation mm (inches)	38.5 (1.52)	30.7 (1.21)	32.9 (1.30)	30.7 (1.21)	48.9 (1.93)	57.7 (2.27)	77.9 (3.07)	67.6 (2.66)	60.6 (2.39)	57.4 (2.26)	49.2 (1.94)	46.0 (1.81)	598.1 (23.55)
Average extreme snow depth cm (inches)	6.3 (2.5)	7.0 (2.8)	4.6 (1.8)	0.8 (0.3)	0.0 (0.0)	0.0 (0.0)	0.0 (0.0)	0.0 (0.0)	0.0 (0.0)	0.0 (0.0)	0.8 (0.3)	4.3 (1.7)	7.0 (2.8)
Average precipitation days (≥ 0.1 mm)	18.30	15.47	14.23	11.17	11.87	13.87	14.43	14.20	13.93	15.83	17.20	18.57	179.07
Average snowy days (≥ 0 cm)	11.3	13.1	6.8	0.5	0.0	0.0	0.0	0.0	0.0	0.0	1.4	6.3	39.4
Average relative humidity (%)	86.9	85.7	82.8	80.6	80.4	80.5	81.8	81.8	83.1	84.9	88.1	88.1	83.7
Mean monthly sunshine hours	41.5	68.5	135.2	216.2	273.1	277.7	276.1	258.9	175.1	113.7	48.0	35.2	1,919.3
Source 1: Institute of Meteorology and Water Management
Source 2: Meteomodel.pl (records, relative humidity 1991–2020)

== Gallery ==
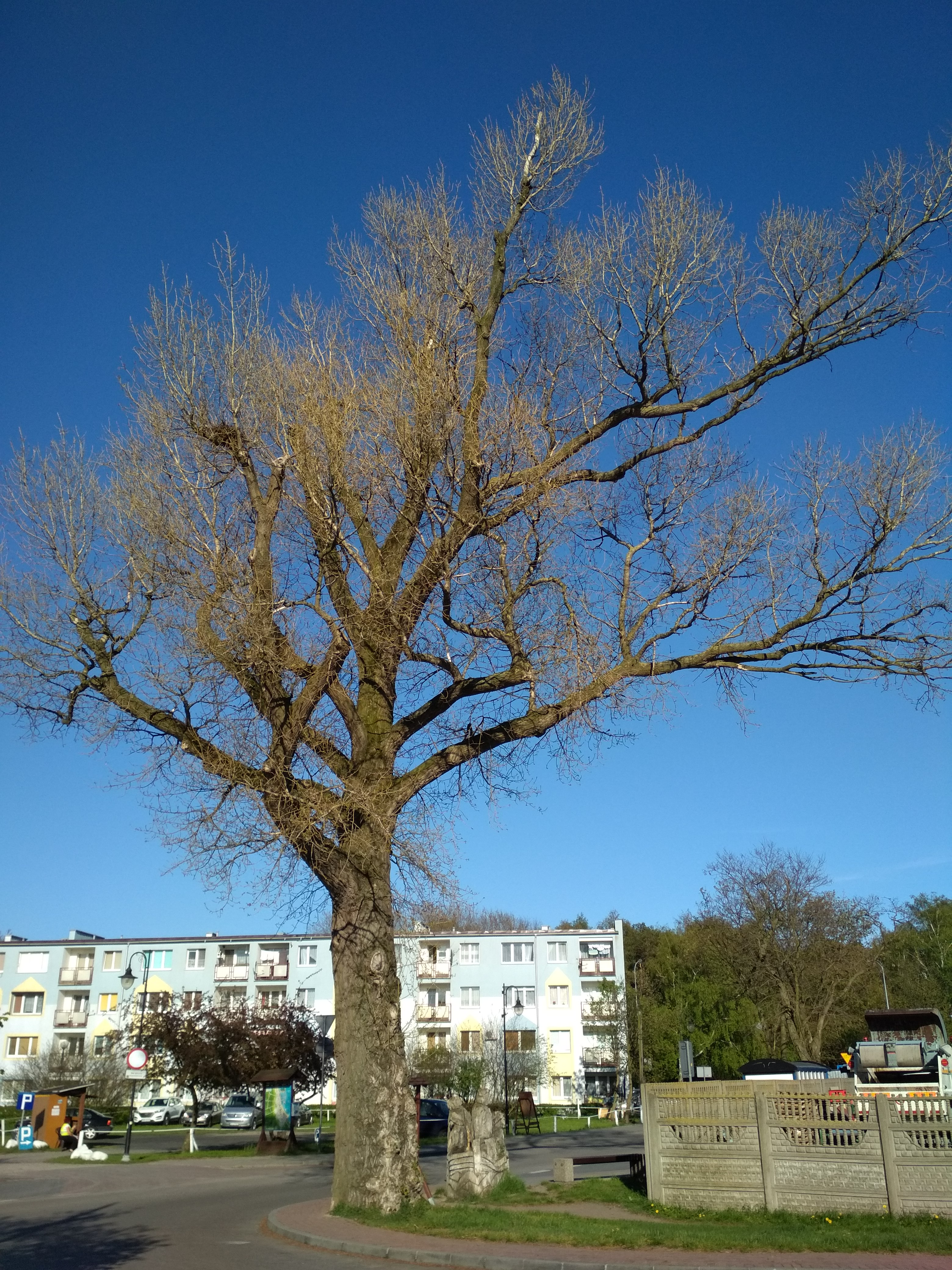
"Topola Helena" tree in Hel

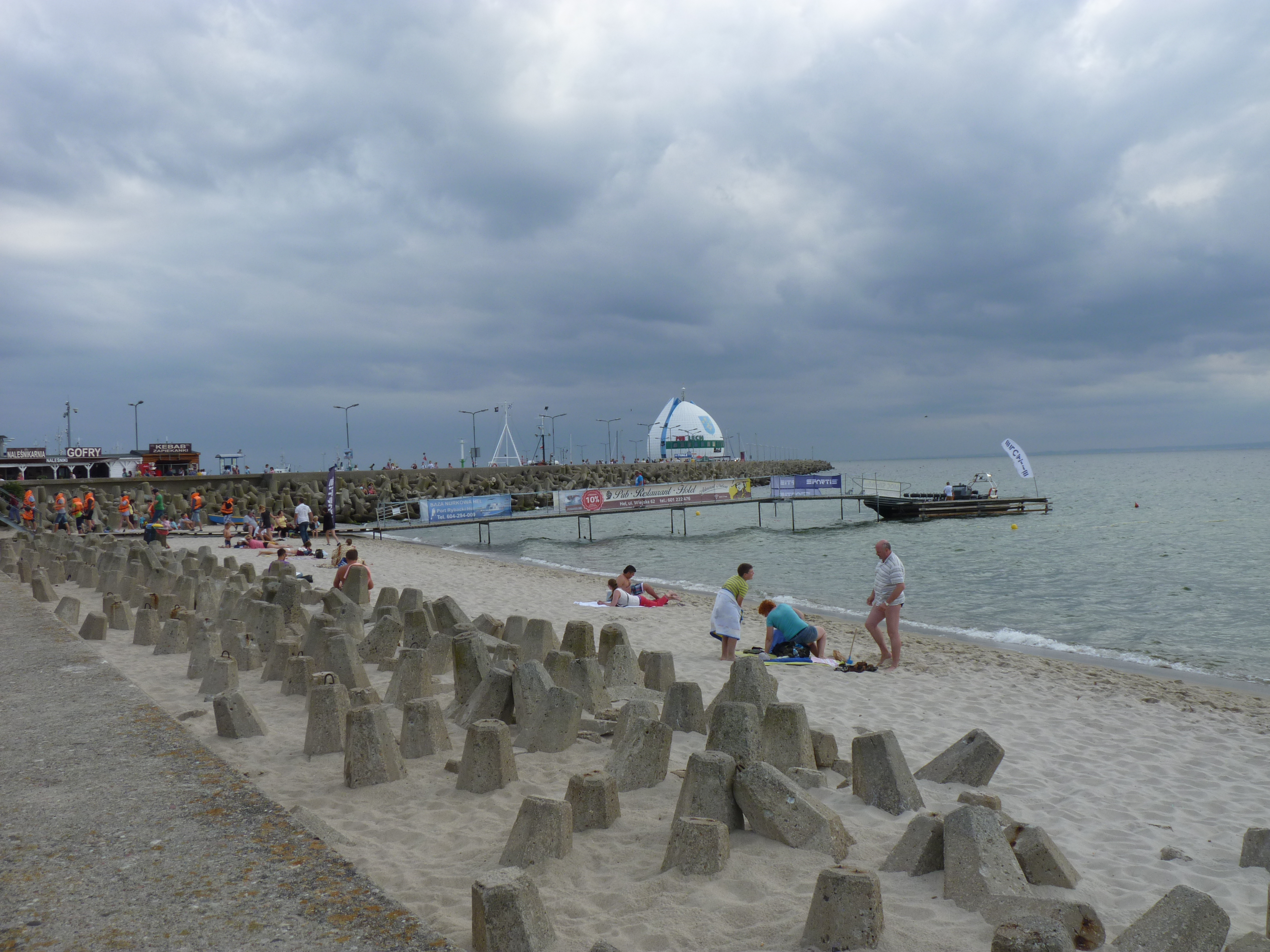
The beach, looking roughly south towards the harbour wall

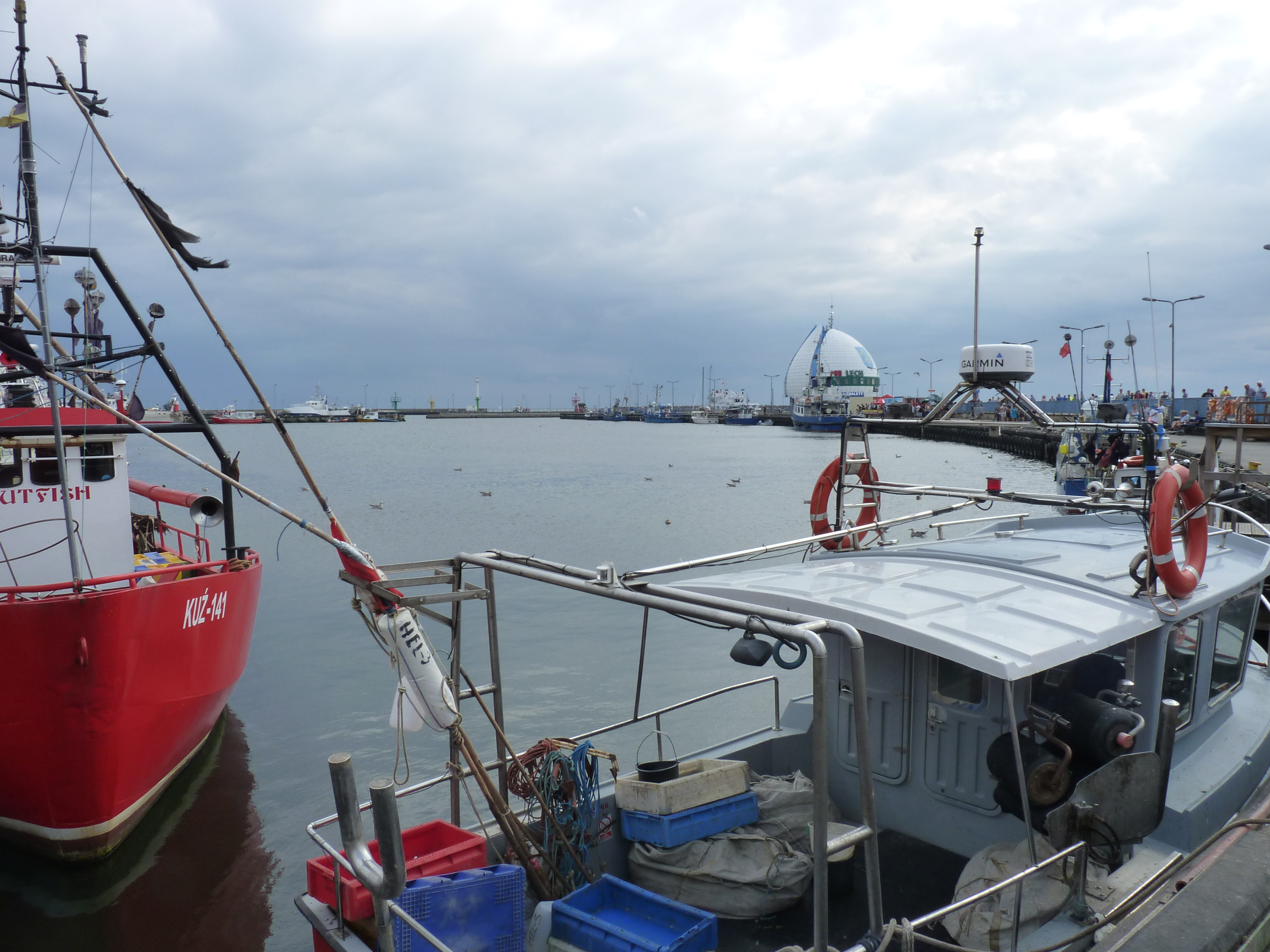
The harbour as seen from the dockside

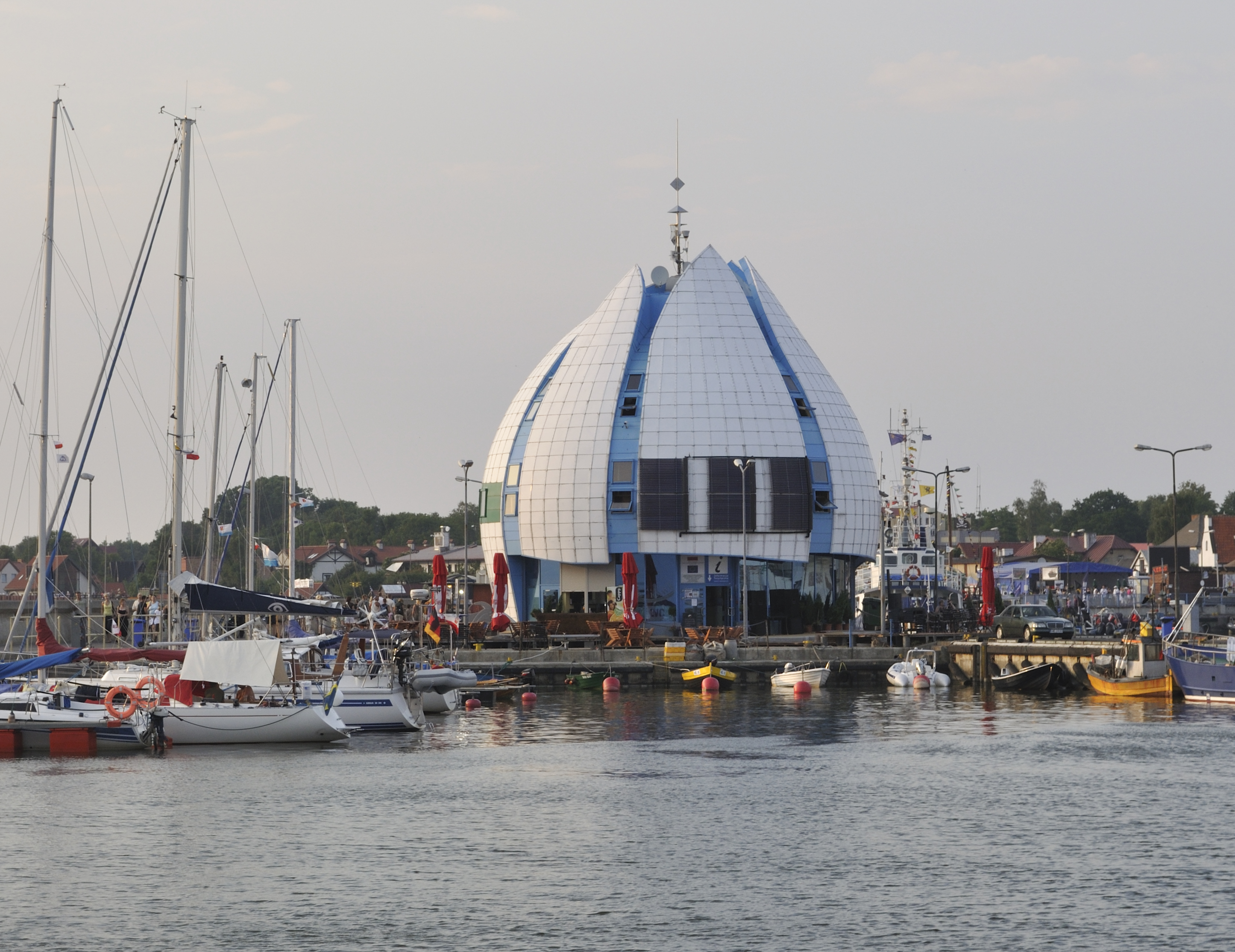
Mayor's Egg seen from the pier

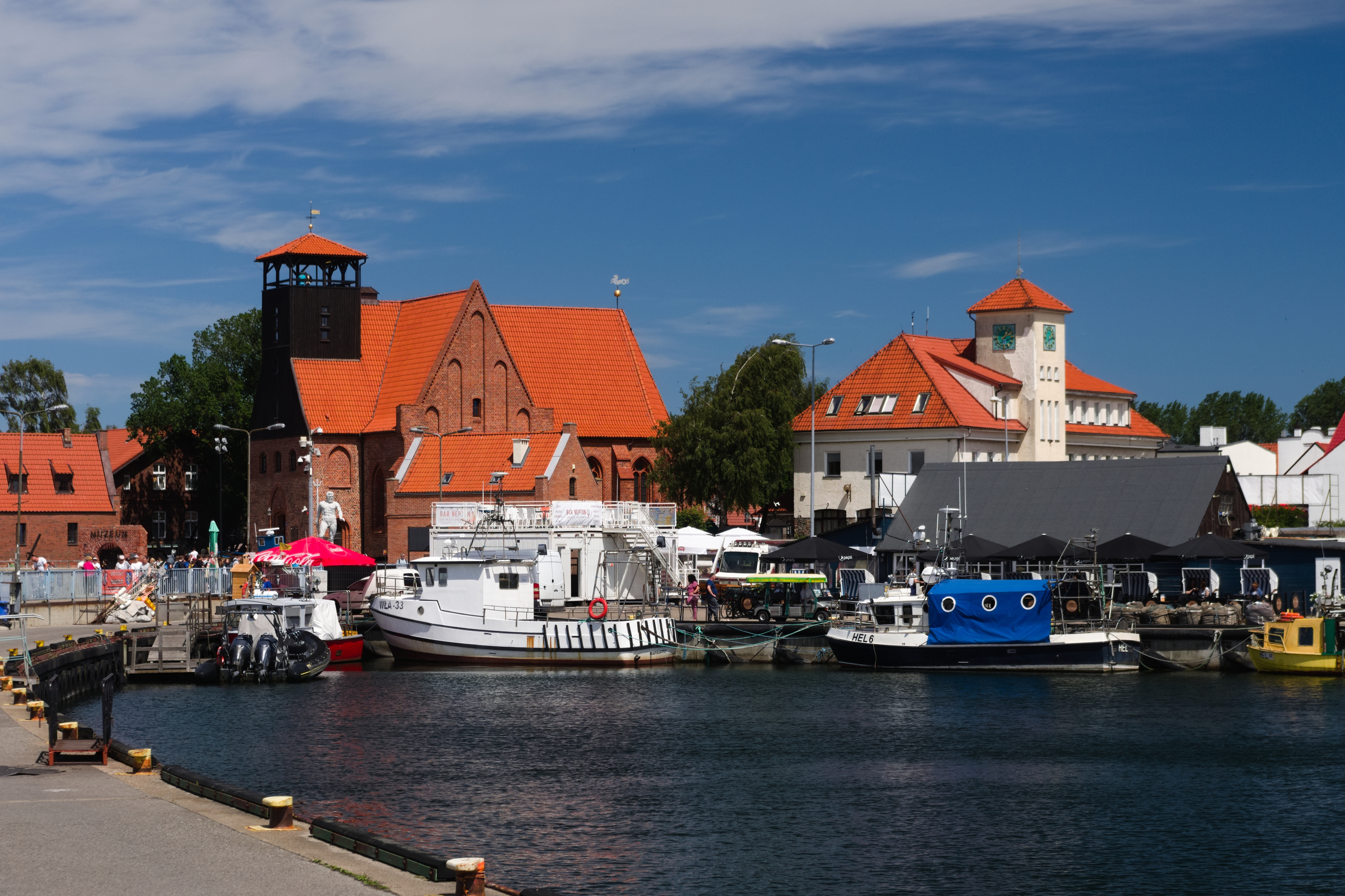
Hel Harbour seen from the pier

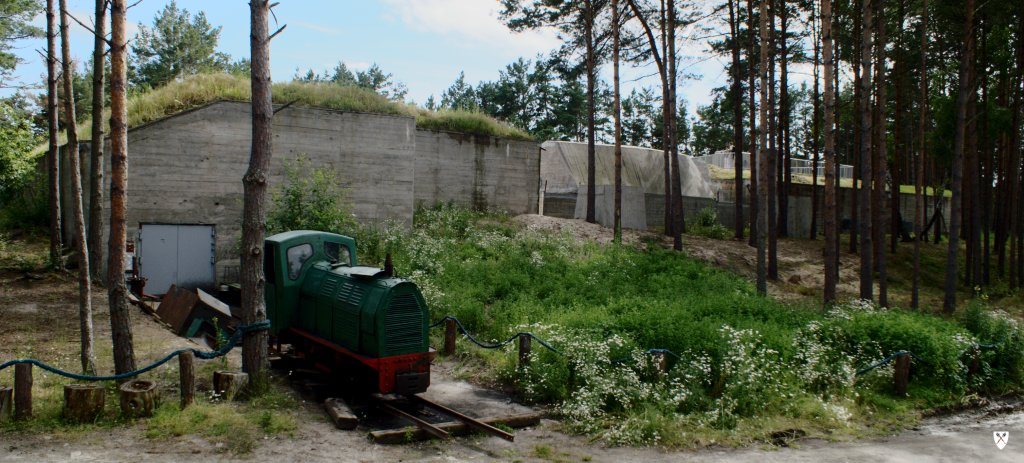
Hel Fortified Area

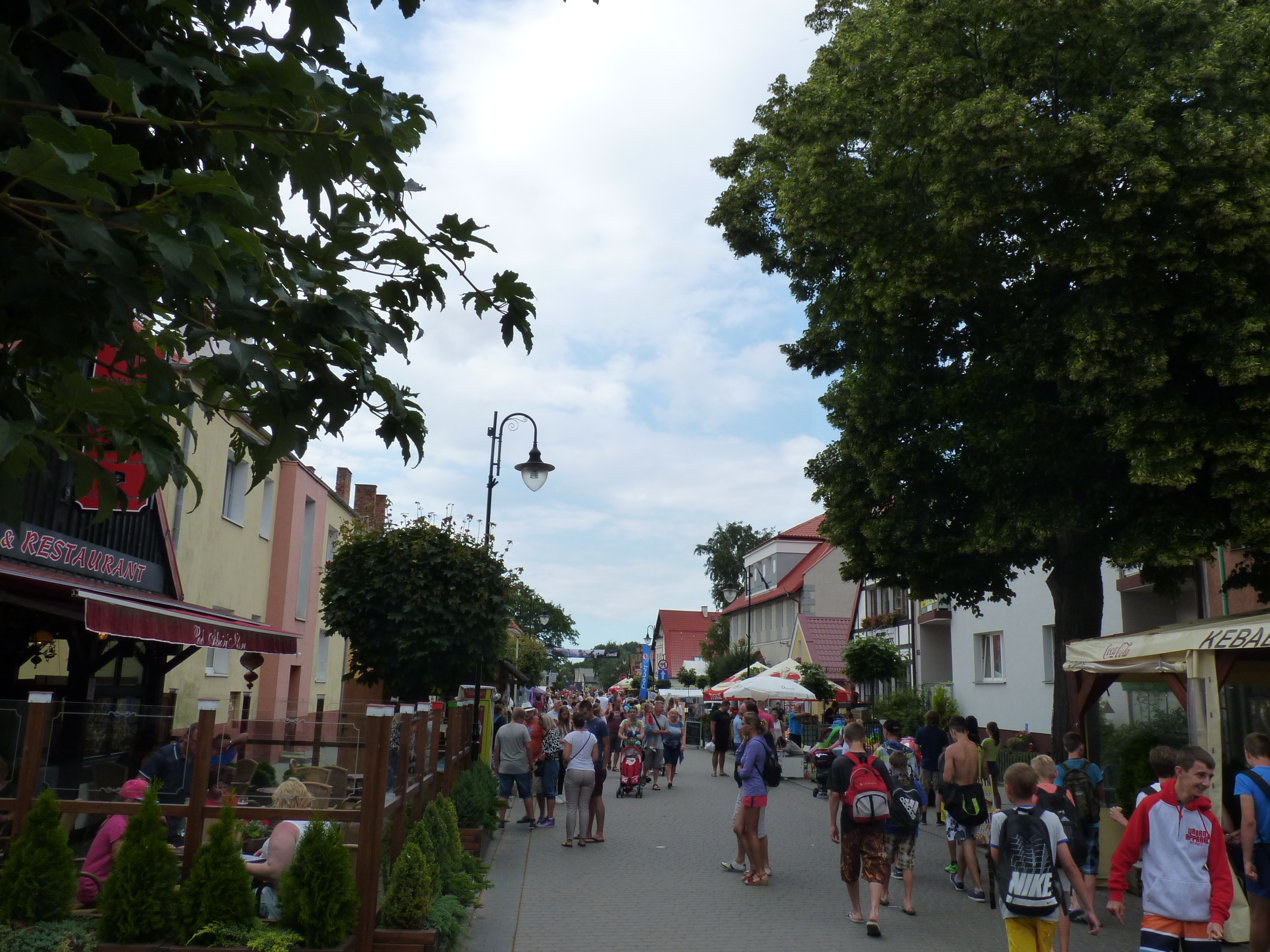
Looking roughly north-west along Ulica Wiejska in the centre of Hel

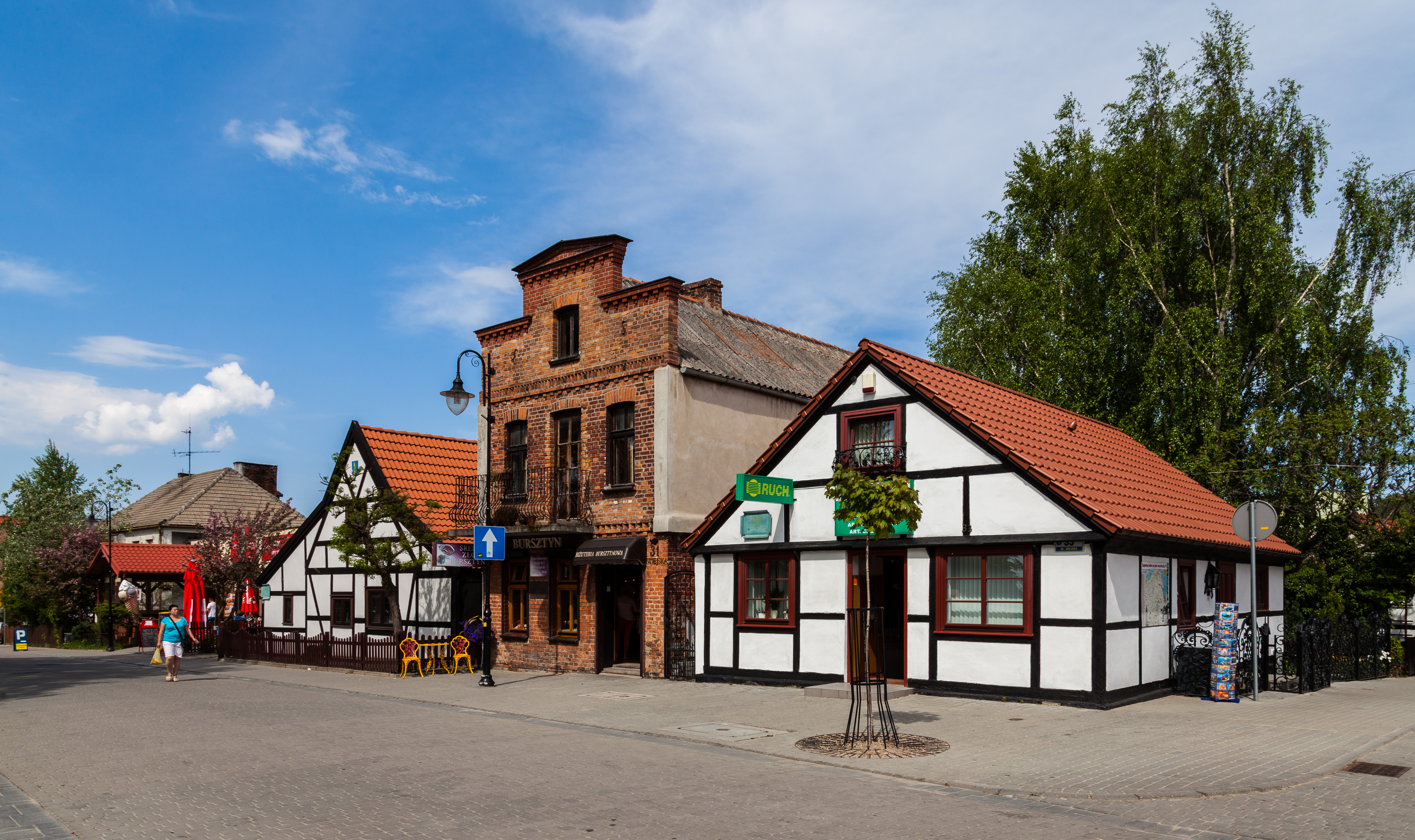
timber framed heritage houses

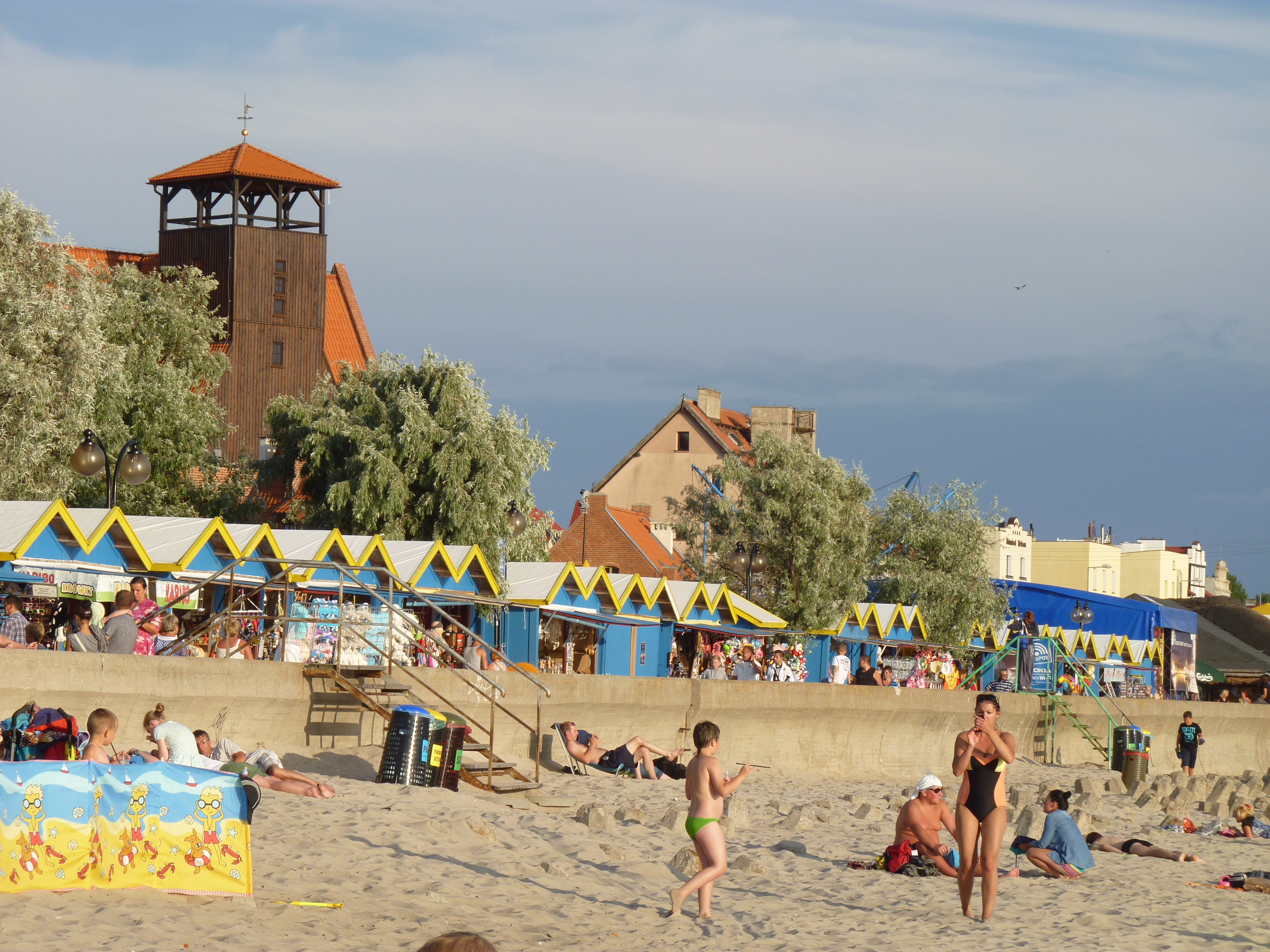
beach in Hel

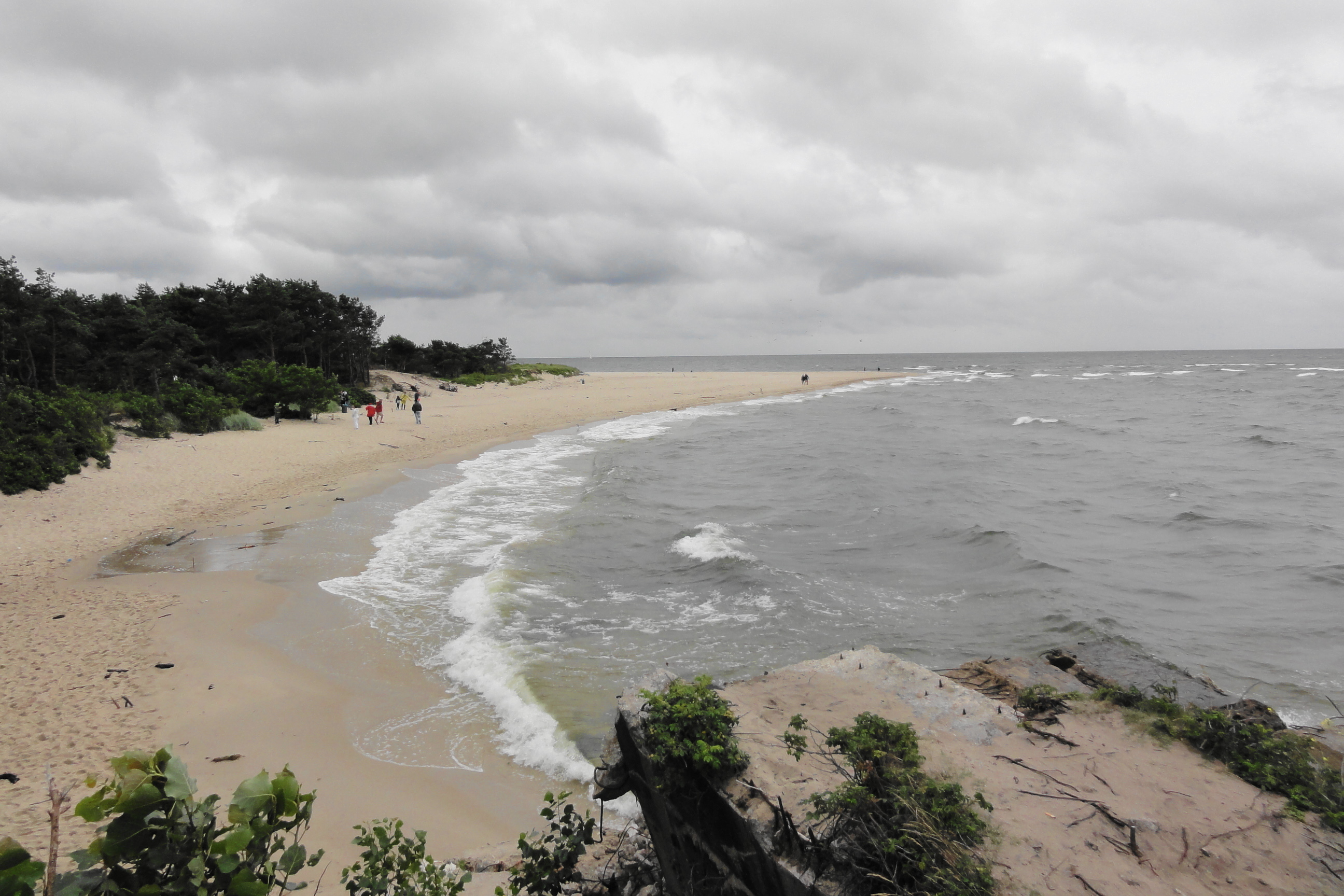

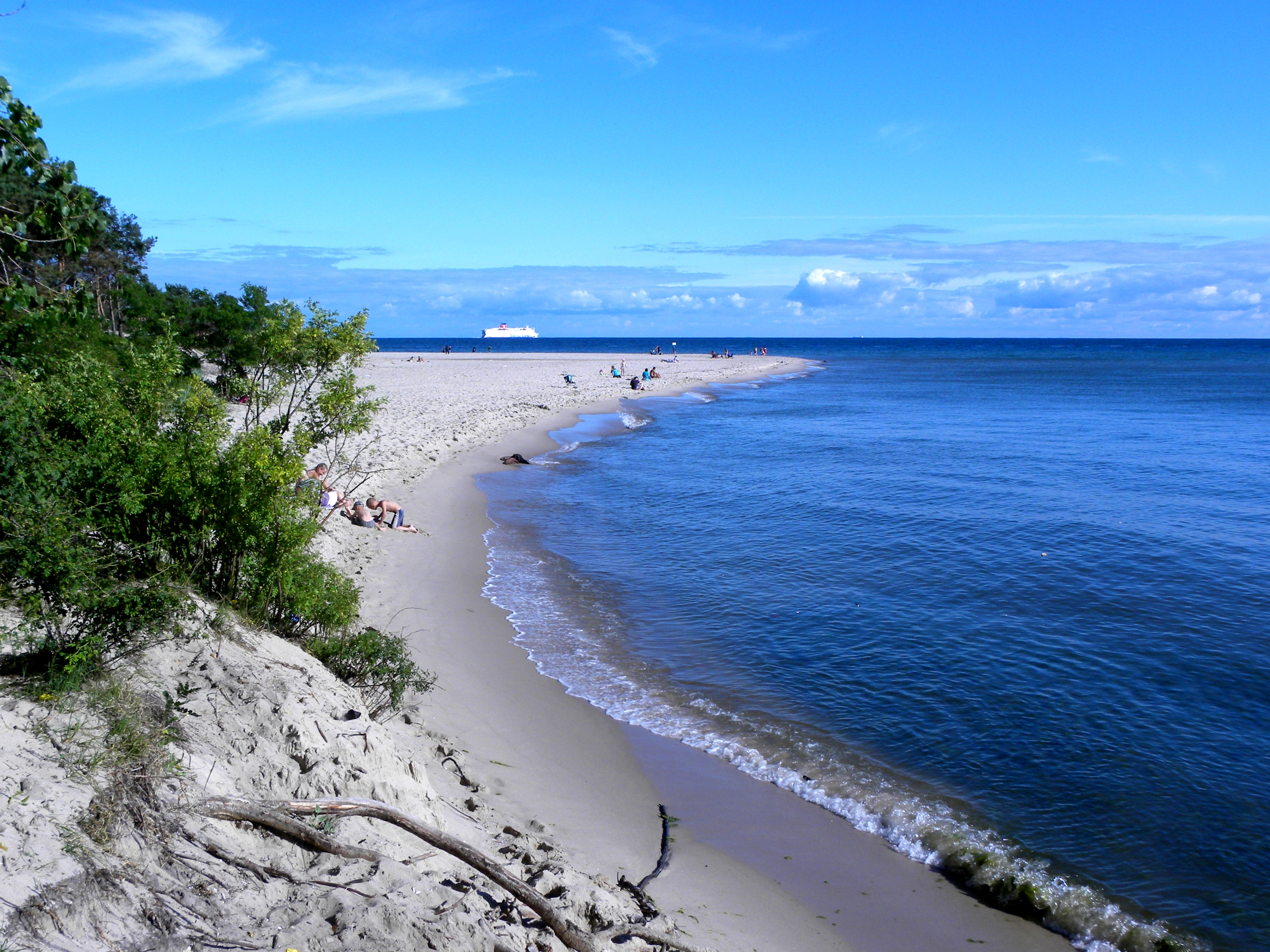

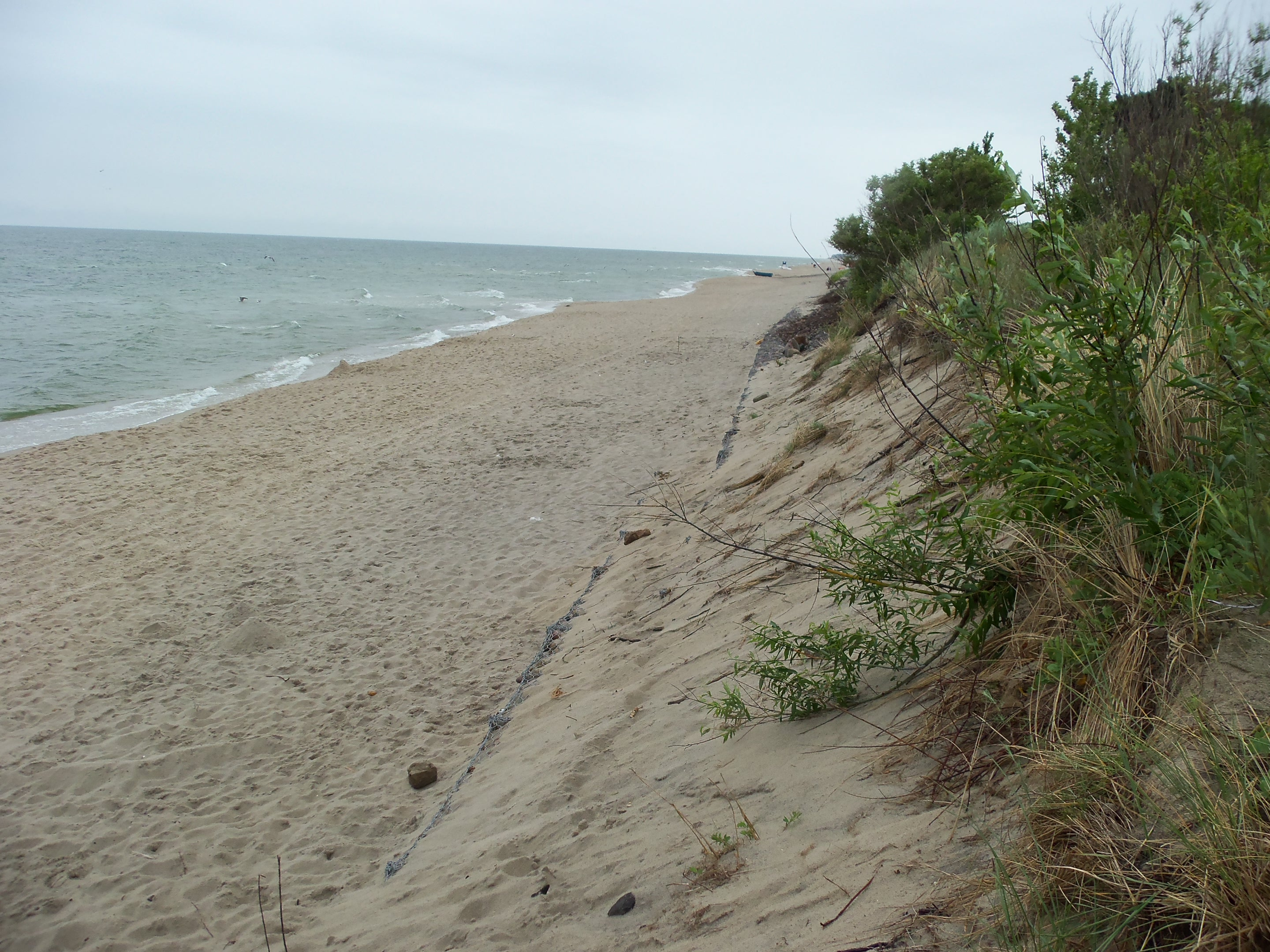

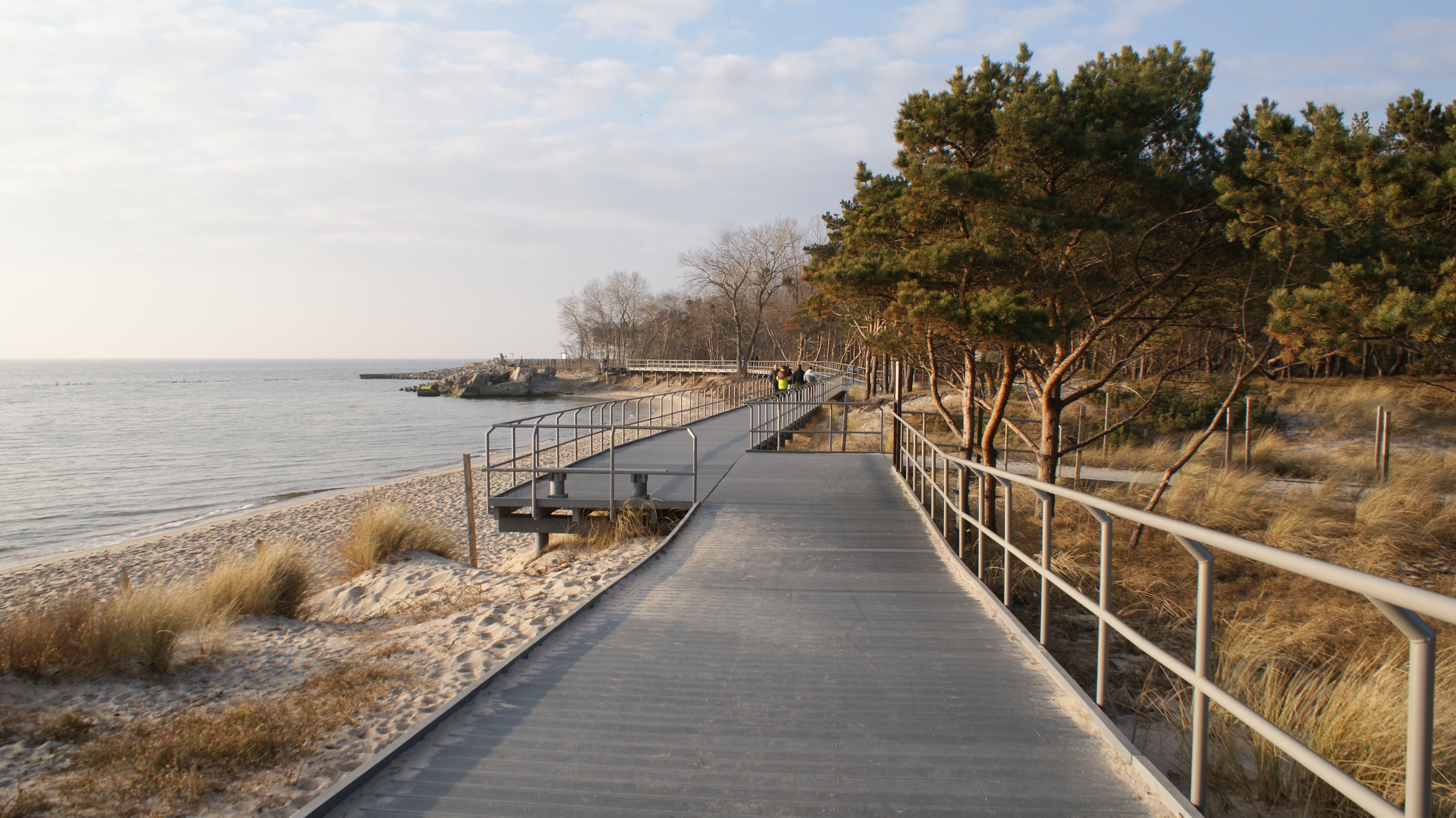

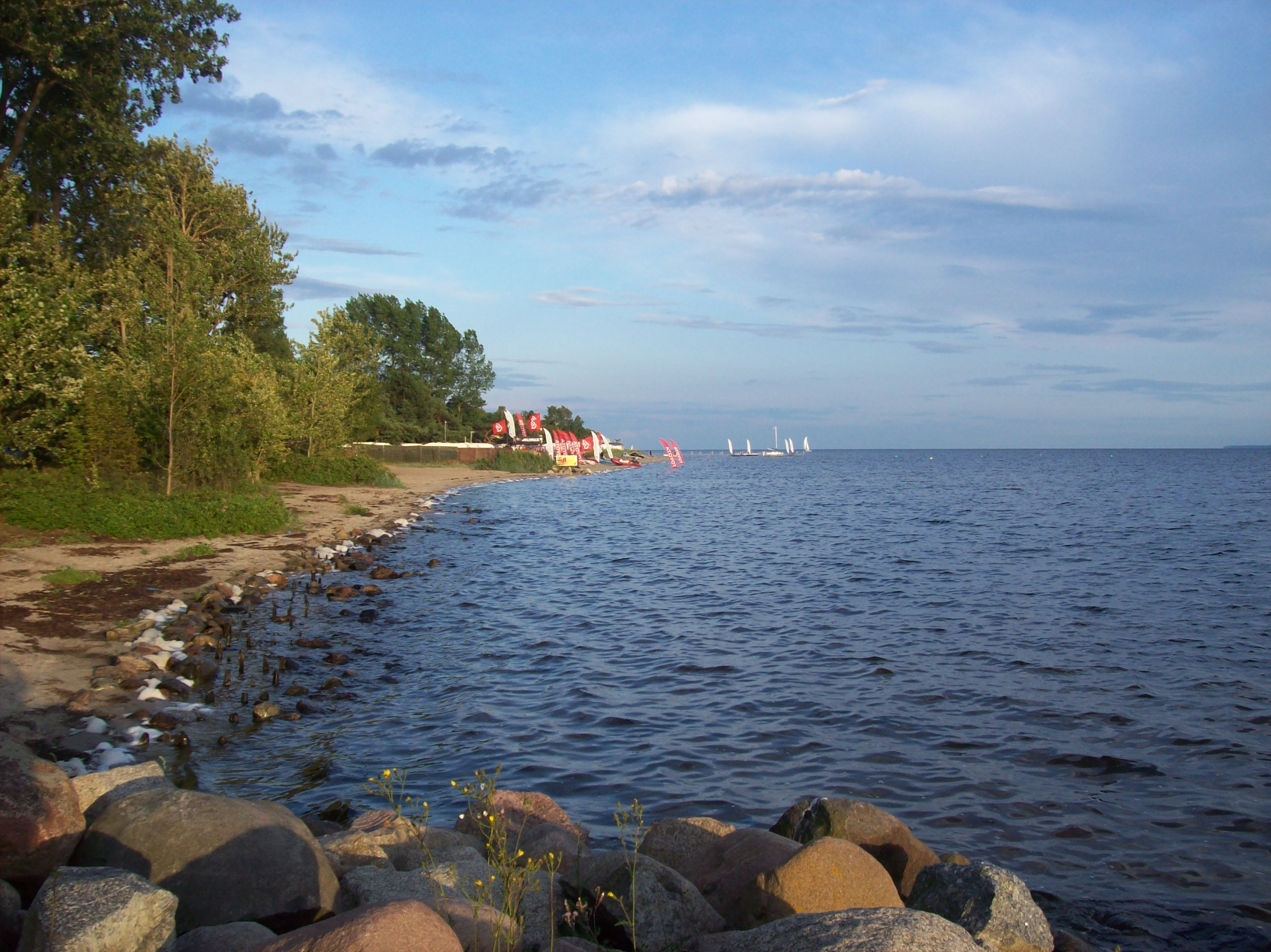

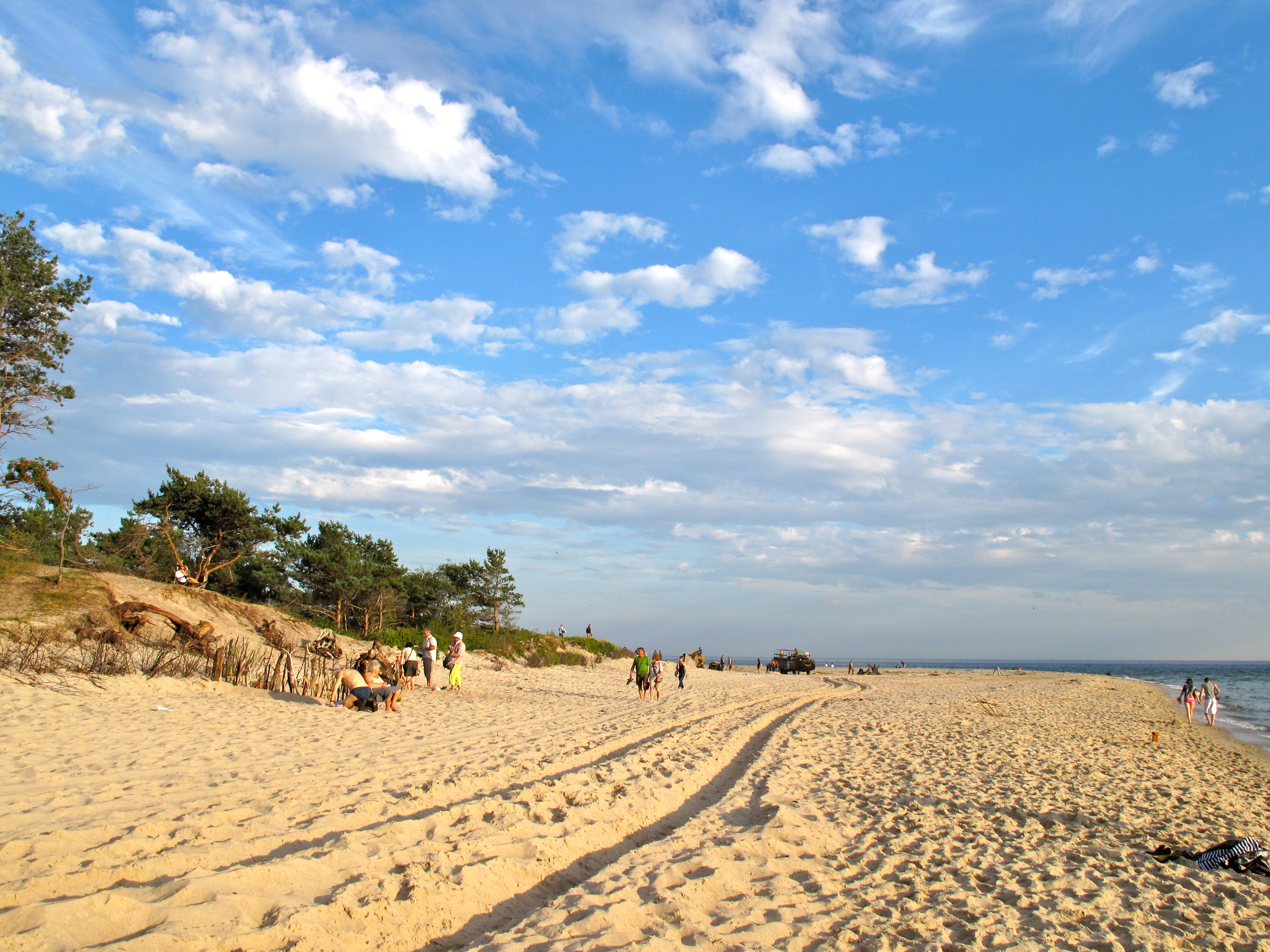
