= Polish Merchant Navy =

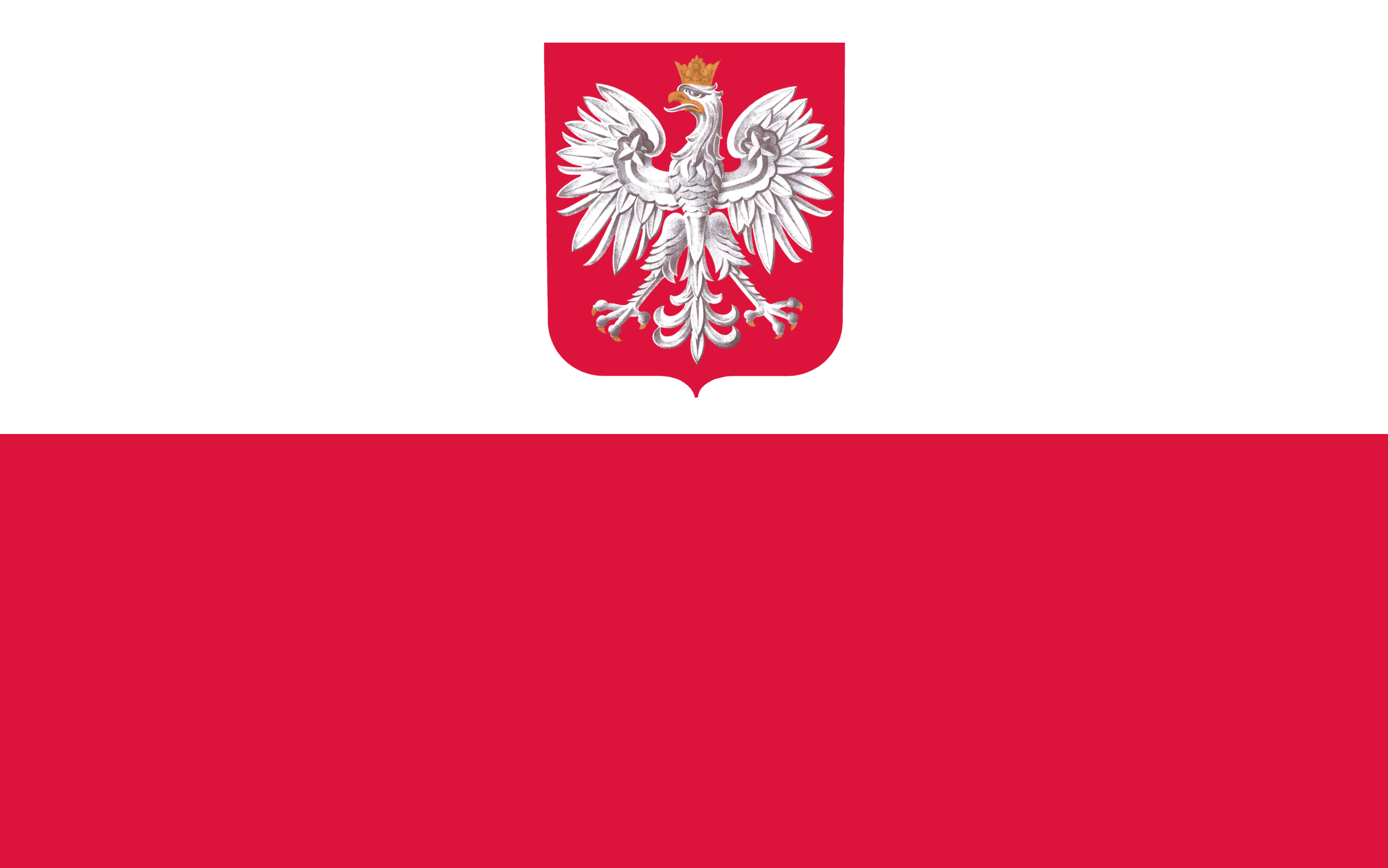
Flag of Polish Merchant Navy

The Polish Merchant Navy (Polish: Polska Marynarka Handlowa, PMH) was created in the interwar period when the Second Polish Republic regained independence.

During World War II, many ships of the Polish Navy joined the Allied merchant navy and its convoys, as part of the Polish contribution to World War II.

After the war, the Polish Merchant Navy was controlled by the People's Republic of Poland and after 1989, by modern Poland.

== Numbers ==
Total: 57 ships (1,000 GT or over) totaling 1,120,165 GT/1,799,569 tonnes deadweight (DWT)

Ships by type: bulk 50, cargo 2, chemical tanker 2, roll-on/roll-off 1, short-sea passenger 2 (1999 est.)

== Major companies ==
Major Polish shipping companies include:

- Polska Żegluga Morska (Polish Steamship Company, POLSTEAM)
- Polskie Linie Oceaniczne (Polish Ocean Lines, POL)

== See also ==
- Polish Navy
