= Kuivasaari =

Island in Helsinki, Finland

Coordinates: 60°06′N 25°01′E

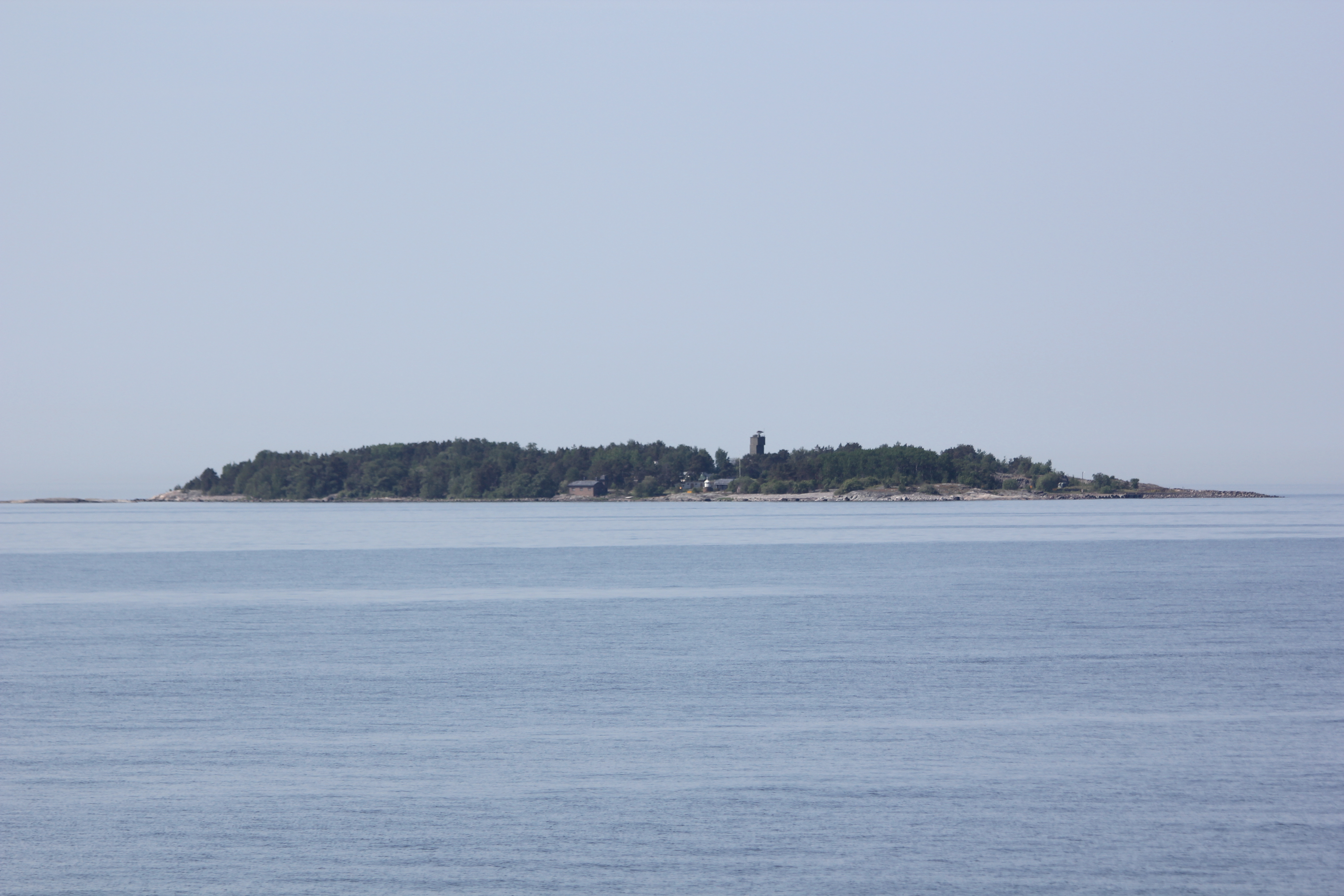
Kuivasaari

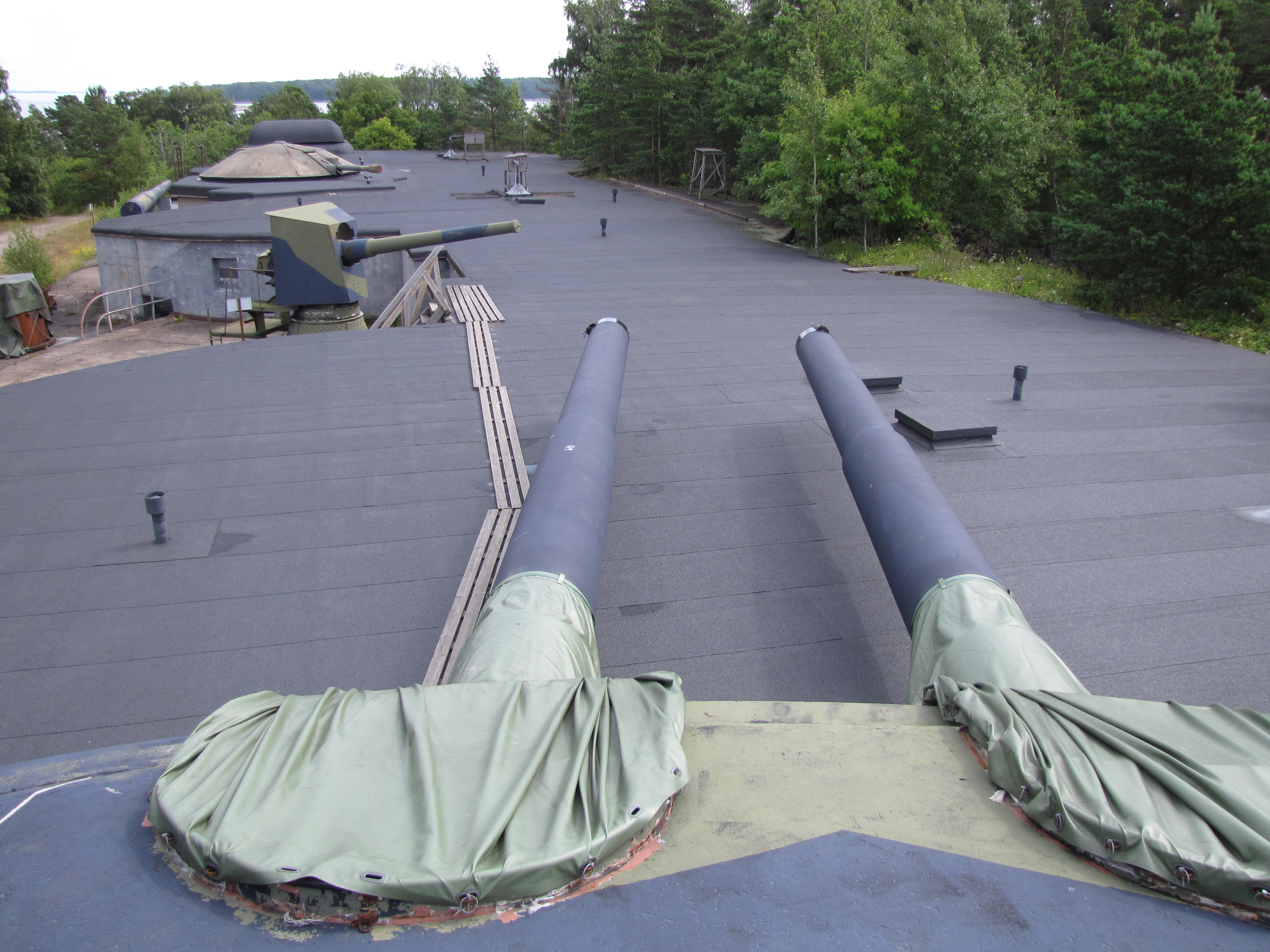
Old coastal artillery in Kuivasaari. Photo taken from roof of a 305 mm twin turret.

Kuivasaari (Torra Mjölö in Swedish) is a Finnish island in the Gulf of Finland, near Helsinki.

Kuivasaari is located some 5 kilometres (3 miles) out into the Gulf of Finland, due south of Helsinki city centre, and was for many years the outermost inhabited island in the Helsinki archipelago (now there is no permanent settlement based on the island). It lies parallel to the Harmaja lighthouse, and the main shipping route into and out of Helsinki passes between the two. In fair weather the city of Tallinn, Estonia on the southern shore of the Gulf of Finland is visible from the observation tower.

The whole island is a military installation of the Finnish Defence Forces, and access for civilians is heavily restricted. A number of coastal artillery guns are installed there, including some exceptionally heavy 12-inch (305 mm) pieces. The island served as an important coastal artillery fort protecting the entrance to Helsinki harbour during the World Wars.

The island gets its name, meaning 'dry island', from the fact that there is no fresh water on the island, and water is instead pumped from the nearby Isosaari island.

== History of the island ==
Coastal fishermen used the island as their base from the 18th century on. In 1896, the state of Russia bought the island for military use. Less than a decade later, after the disastrous Russo-Japanese War, the Russians had a need to fortify the coastal western areas of the empire, and fortification works on the island began on the eve of World War I. The island became part of Peter the Great's Naval Fortress, to which belonged 212 points of land and islands in Finland. When the war broke out, the Kuivasaari fortress was almost completed. However, war time action was never experienced during the war. During the Finnish Civil War, after the German Baltic Sea Division invaded the Hanko Peninsula, the Russian soldiers in Kuivasaari fled to Petrograd. The Kuivasaari Battery remained intact, and the Germans trained Finnish men to use it, men who had at least an elementary knowledge of the German language.

The barracks could house a hundred men, and in the battery there was room for another hundred men. The officers had their own quarters. At most, 250 military personnel lived on the island.

== The gun turret ==
The Russians left on the island 12"/52 Pattern 1907 guns that had been manufactured in the Obukhov State Plant near St. Petersburg. In the 1930s, they were housed in a heavy double turret, which is one of the few remaining such guns in the world. The turret has 5 floors, and it weighs a million kilograms. It is 19 metres tall, and its diameter is 16 metres. The shooting sector is 360 degrees, and the shells weigh 471 kilograms. The range is 40 kilometres. 15–20 persons were required to calculate the firing values, and a further 80–137 men were needed to operate the guns.

The guns were part of the coastal defense of Finland, but they were only fired twice during the Second World War, once during an exercise, and once when the Soviets were retreating from Hanko in the autumn of 1941.

After the war, the Allied Control Commission demanded that the guns be dismantled. The barrels were taken a hundred kilometres away to the Armoured Brigade in Parola. However, in 1960 the guns were brought back and installed again. During the 1960s and 1970 many test firings were conducted, but after that the firings were discontinued. The firings caused enormous shock waves, and all the doors and windows on the island had to be opened during the firings, otherwise they would have been broken.

The turret is still operational, but it is fired only ceremonially, such as during the Finnish Independence Day. The shots are so called water shots, i.e. instead of a projectile, a polystyrene plug is put in the barrel as well as a plastic bag with 500 kilograms of water. The charge is an ordinary one. In this way, the same pressure is achieved as with a shell, and the springs, the restrainer and the return mechanisms function normally. In principle, it would be possible to fire shells, but there are some practical concerns: this would mean live firing, and it would need to be published ahead of time and it would need to be monitored by army personnel. At the same time, the Gulf of Finland would need be cleared of maritime traffic within 50 kilometres, and of air traffic to the height of 10 kilometres, which is not possible.

The use of the guns was given up early in the 1970s, when the electric equipment went into poor shape, and the gun was retired of possible war time use. The last theoretical use for the guns would have been to fire on the Seutula Airport, as it was then known, in case there was a need to protect it from invading troops. The guns were in danger of having been scrapped, but in the 1980s, the commander of the Suomenlinna Coastal Regiment decided to save it. The Suomenlinna Coastal Regiment Guild restored the turret in the late 1980s and early 1990s, and it is being maintained so that it can be used.

== The island today ==
The Suomenlinna Coastal Regiment Guild maintains a notable collection of historical guns on the island. Earlier, a 100 56 TK was also maintained on the island, but it has now been decommissioned. The island fortress is not in use, but it still belongs to the Finnish Defence Forces.

The Military Museum of Finland had wanted to turn the island into a museum, but due to lack of funds, this project was not realized. However, the Suomenlinna Coastal Regiment Guild has seen to it that the houses and the equipment has been maintained.

In principle, access is severely restricted, and the public is not permitted to go ashore or to approach the island to less than 100 meters, but several companies organize chartered tours to the island. Permits have to be secured beforehand, and visitors must carry IDs.

== Sources ==
- Enqvist, Ove: Kuivasaari (3. p.). Suomenlinnan Rannikkotykistökilta. Helsinki 2009
- Enqvist, Ove: Isosaari ja Kuivasaari. Suomenlinnan rannikkotykistökilta. Helsinki 1991
