= Galicia and World War II =

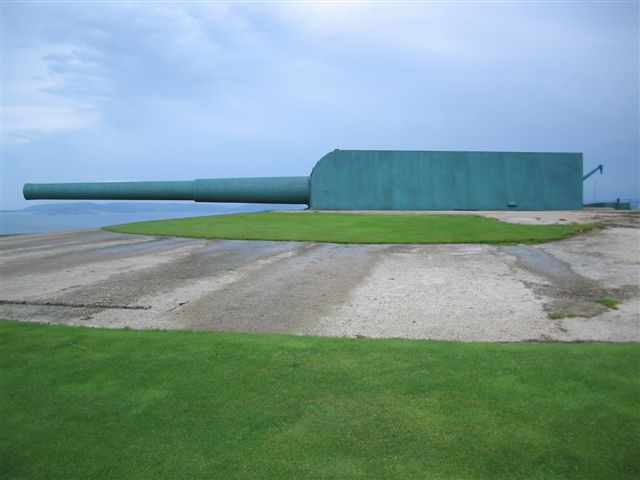
38.1 cm /45 Model 1926 naval guns of the Monte de San Pedro in A Coruña, with 35 km range, protected the Galician ports of Ferrol and A Coruña for Nazi Germany

The participation of Galicia (Spain) in World War II was marked by its location on Spain's Atlantic coast and its mines. Despite the neutrality of Spain during World War II, the country was affected due to its strategic location. The tungsten mines, such as the mine of San Finx, were used for the Axis war industry. Extraction and transport of the mineral was carried out by front companies, such as the Finance and Industrial Corporation (Galician: Sociedade Financeira e Industrial).

Hundreds of Galicians traveled to fight with the Germans on the Eastern Front, in the Blue Division. On the other side, former Republican combatants fought with the allies, many of them having been confined in French concentration camps.

== Tungsten ==
Raw materials were vital in economic warfare. Tungsten was one of those used to manufacture armaments. Before the war, the main producers were China (36%), Burma (17%) and the United States of America (11%). During the war, British sea power gave the Allied powers access to these countries, and denied them to the Axis powers. Germany had to seek sources in Europe. Spain and Portugal were the only producers, with Galicia accounting for almost 70% of Spanish reserves. This made it the focus of the Wolfram Crisis.

Year	Quantity (t)	Value in millions of pesetas
1939	76	0,755
1940	563	6,985
1941	156	3,623
1942	159	18,751
1943	1396	241,054
1944	2502	406,455
1945	1662	246,221

== Lorenz beam ==
Radius of scope of the signal of the Arneiro Towers.

In 1939, the Germans built a 112-metre-high (367 ft) aerial, in Arneiro in the municipality of Cospeito. It carried the communications of the Kriegsmarine and Luftwaffe, with a radius of one thousand miles (1,600 km). The station had two repeating lower and auxiliary buildings.

It formed part of a German network of nineteen stations. The Allies' sabotage plans were not carried out, since Spain was treated as a neutral country. The Lorenz beam was also eventually used by the British and Americans.

== See also ==
- Spain during World War II
