= 100 56 TK =

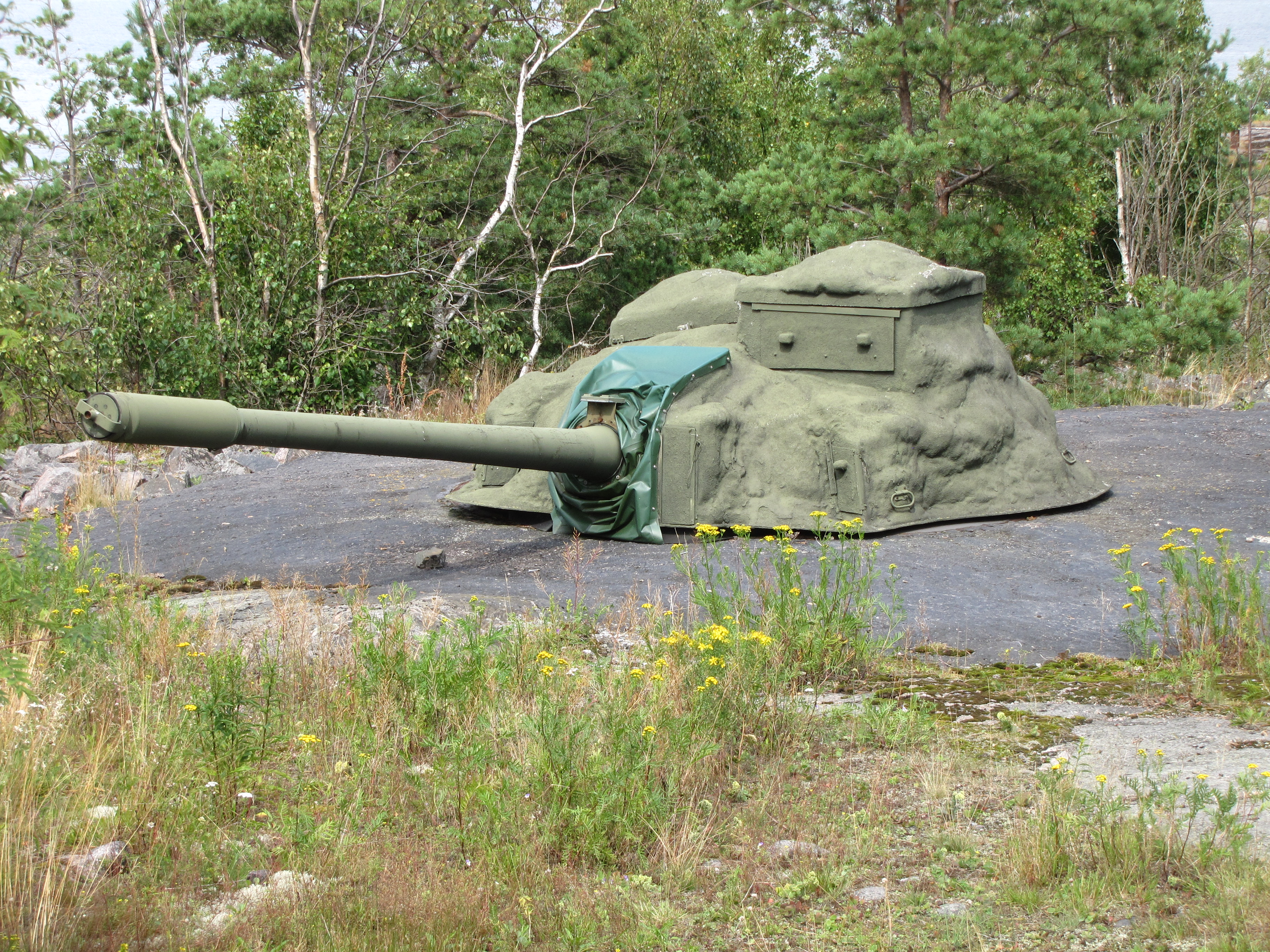
- 100 56 TK in Kuivasaari island in 2009
- Type: Fixed coastal artillery gun
- Place of origin: Finland; Soviet Union

Service history
- In service: 1969–2012
- Used by: Coastal artillery of Finland

Specifications
- Barrel length: 5.608 m (18 ft 5 in) (total); 5.350 m (17 ft 7 in) (barrel without breech); 4.630 m (15 ft 2 in) (rifled part)
- Crew: 1 + 8
- Caliber: 100 mm (3.9 in)
- Carriage: Fixed coastal fortification
- Traverse: 360°
- Rate of fire: 6 rounds per minute
- Muzzle velocity: 880 m/s (2,900 ft/s)
- Maximum firing range: 18 km (11 mi)

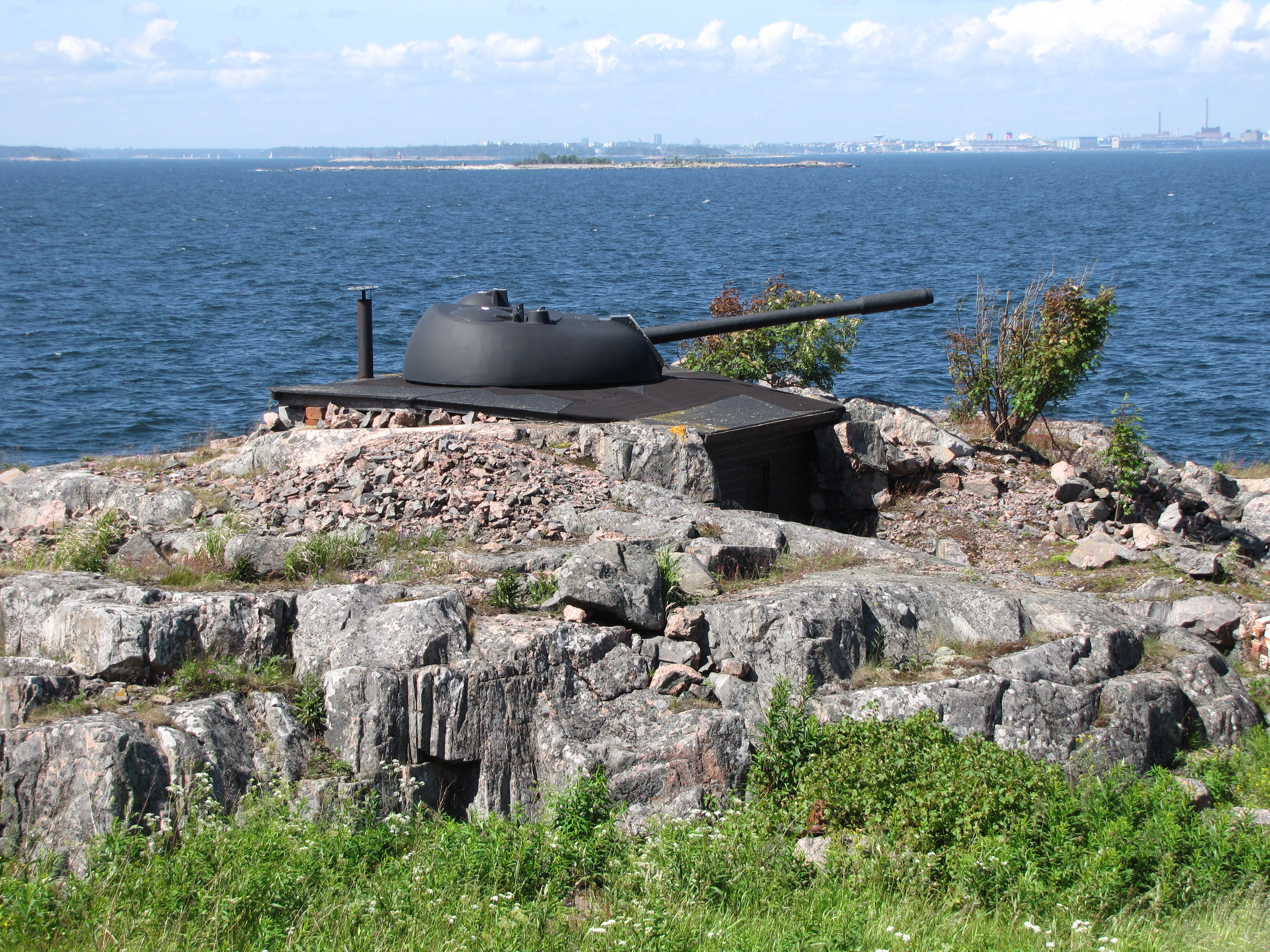
A decoy 100 56 TK on Kuivasaari island

100 56 TK or 100 TK ("100 mm, 56 length caliber, turret gun") is a Finnish stationary coastal artillery gun that utilizes the tank turret from the Soviet T-55 tank with its 100 mm D-10 tank gun. 100 56 TK was the main light weapon of the Finnish coastal artillery and complemented the medium gun 130 53 TK in the coastal artillery role until its decommissioning in 2012.

== Background ==
After World War II the primary fixed light coastal guns in Finland were older heavy anti-aircraft guns on fortification mounts that were obsolete in air defence duties and had been transferred to coastal artillery, primarily 76 ItK 16 V and 76 ItK 31 ss. These guns were inadequate for their role in firepower, range and survivability. The idea of using tank turrets as coastal guns was first raised regarding Charioteer and Comet turrets. In 1966 yliluutnantti Juhani Niska submitted a proposal to use modified 100 mm T-54 tank turret as coastal gun. The proposal compared also Swedish 75 mm Bofors turret gun and 76 ItK 31 ss as other possibilities. 100 mm T-54 turret was considered the most suitable solution, and after a T-54 turret was tested in Katajaluoto it was decided to purchase 56 T-55 turrets from Soviet Union and modify them as 100 56 TK coastal gun. As a cost-saving measure the turrets were ordered without stabilisers. This decision was later criticised the Finnish Army, since while stabilisers are not needed in a fixed fortification, the Finnish Armoured Brigade could have used them as spare parts.

== Design ==
The total barrel length of the 100 TK is 5,608 millimetres (221 in). The maximum range is about 18 kilometres (11 mi). The sustained fire rate is 6 rounds per minute and the muzzle velocity is 880 metres per second (2,900 ft/s) with HE-FRAG shells. The breech block weighs 63.4 kilograms (140 lb). The breech mechanism is semi-automatic and the gun is loaded manually. Guns were modified for a higher maximum elevation and necessary equipment for indirect fire was added. Since the turrets were intended for coastal fortifications the turret insides were coated with asbestos-cork mixture to prevent moisture from condensing into gun position. Messaging, electric and ventilation systems were left mostly intact. A fully automatic loading system would have taken too much space, and simple counterweight operated shell hoisting mechanism was developed to transfer ammunition up to the turret.

== Operation and modifications ==
The first battery was built in 1968–1969. After these batteries were built in 14 sea fortresses, each one equipped with 4 such turrets. The Russians, who had been informed by this program, seemed surprised. At first only gun positions were built, but since the 1970s a second construction phase began to create integrated positions with command- and storage facilities and to improve air- and close defence positions. One turret was built on a wooden platform for testing and training purposes.

In the 1980s planning for a major maintenance and modernization program began. The largest modifications were the electrical system in the turrets and the gun periscope. New periscopes were ordered from Yugoslavia, but the break-up of the nation and the resulting Yugoslav wars caused delays. The guns were equipped with gun computers and laser range-finders, and some of the turrets also with night-vision systems. The electrical systems were replaced using western components and the guns and gun positions were overhauled. Externally the most visible change was new thermal insulation dome on top the turrets that also gives them a more rock-like appearance for camouflage.

The ammunition for the guns has not fulfilled all the expectation. The most serious shortcoming was the lack of dedicated anti-ship shells. In addition to normal tank gun ammunition and air burst shells with mechanical time-delay fuse, semi-armour piercing shells from Riga class frigates (Finnish Navy had two such ships) were available. As attempts to purchase suitable munitions from Russia did not succeed, it was also considered to purchase them from China. However, in the end a domestic development work began in the beginning of the 1990s on shells suitable for naval engagements.

== Decommissioning ==
Most 100 TK batteries were deactivated in 2006–2007 because of closure of the coastal forts due to budgetary reasons as well as the obsolescence of the stationary coastal artillery. The second phase of the deactivation was completed in 2012 after the last live firings in Upinniemi. Most of the turrets have since been transported away for scrapping or resale. The 100 TK battery in Kuivasaari will be preserved as a museum battery.
