= Coastal artillery =

Defensive military service branch

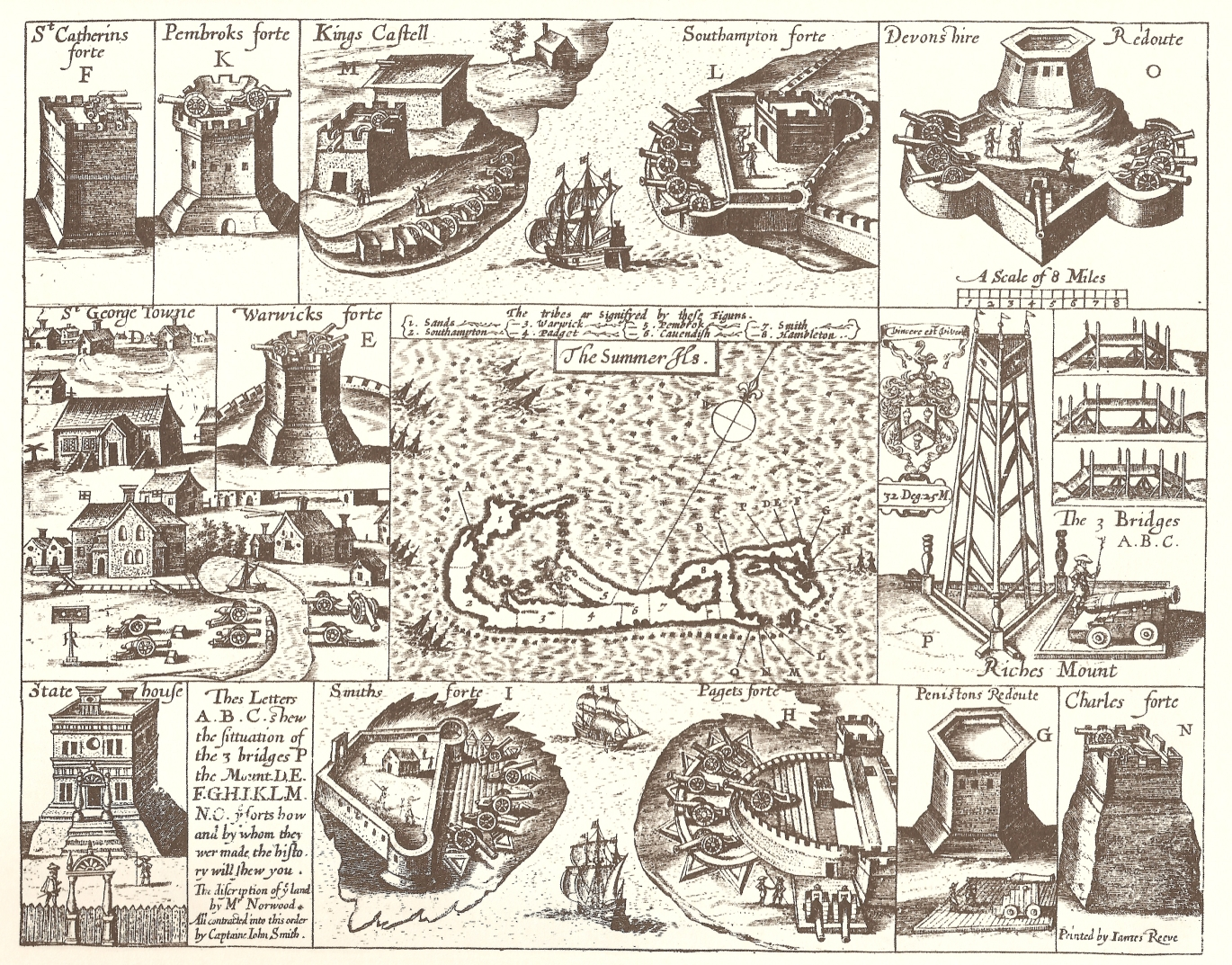
The fortifications of the Castle Harbour Islands and St. George's Harbour, in Bermuda. Construction began in 1612; these were the first stone fortifications, with the first coastal artillery batteries, built by England in the New World.

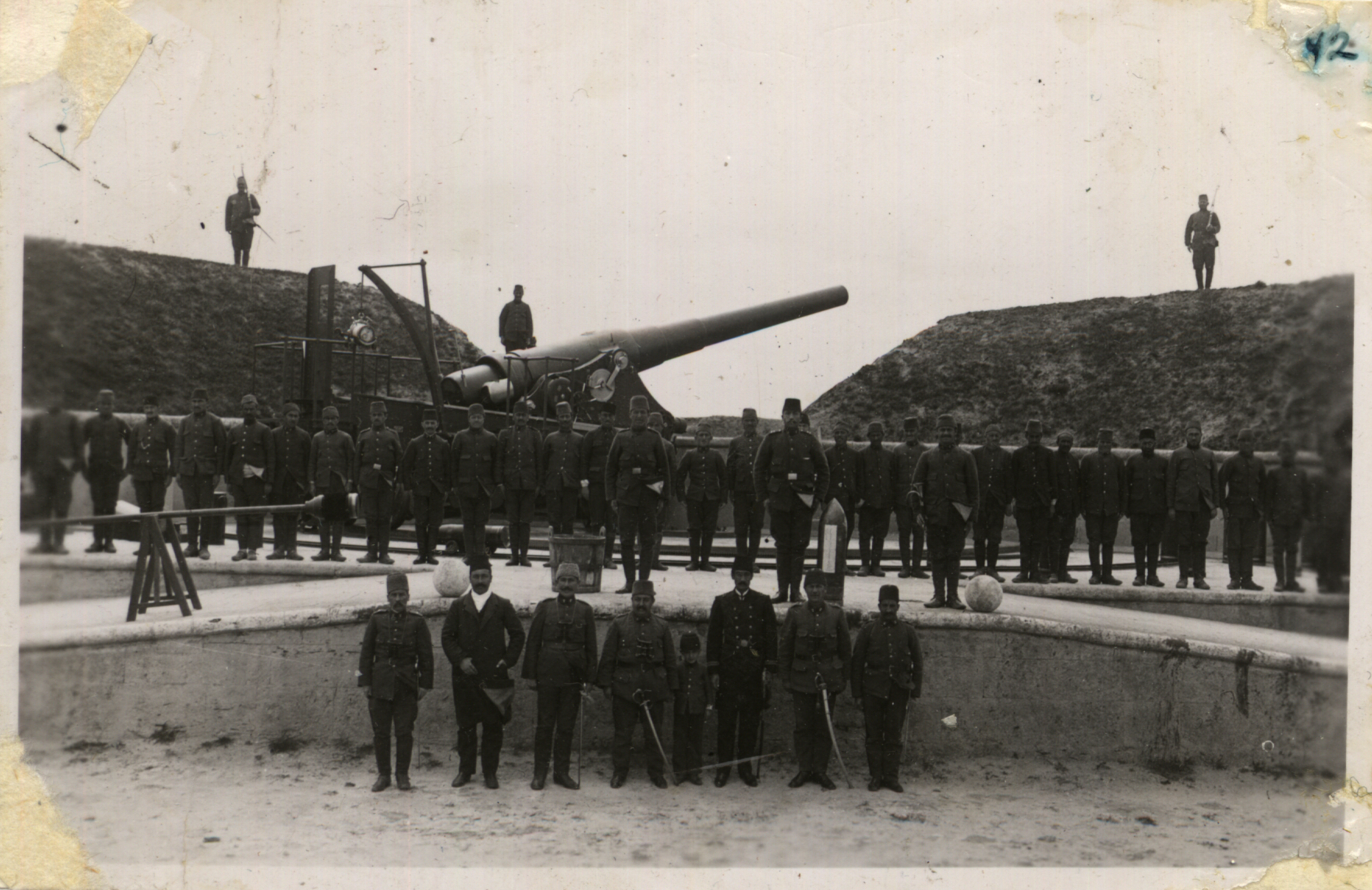
An Ottoman redoubt of the Dardanelles Fortified Area. The weapon is possibly a German-made 28 cm SK L/40 gun on a coast defense mount.

Coastal artillery is the branch of the armed forces concerned with operating anti-ship artillery or fixed gun batteries in coastal fortifications.

From the Middle Ages until World War II, coastal artillery and naval artillery in the form of cannons were highly important to military affairs and generally represented the areas of highest technology and capital cost among materiel. The advent of 20th-century technologies, especially military aviation, naval aviation, jet aircraft, and guided missiles, reduced the primacy of cannons, battleships, and coastal artillery. In countries where coastal artillery has not been disbanded, these forces have acquired amphibious capabilities. In littoral warfare, mobile coastal artillery armed with surface-to-surface missiles can still be used to deny the use of sea lanes.

It was long held as a rule of thumb that one shore-based gun equaled three naval guns of the same caliber, due to the steadiness of the coastal gun, which allowed for significantly higher accuracy than their sea-mounted counterparts. Land-based guns also benefited in most cases from the additional protection of walls or earth mounds. The range of gunpowder-based coastal artillery also has a derivative role in international law and diplomacy, wherein a country's three-mile limit of "coastal waters" is recognized as under the nation or state's laws.

== History ==
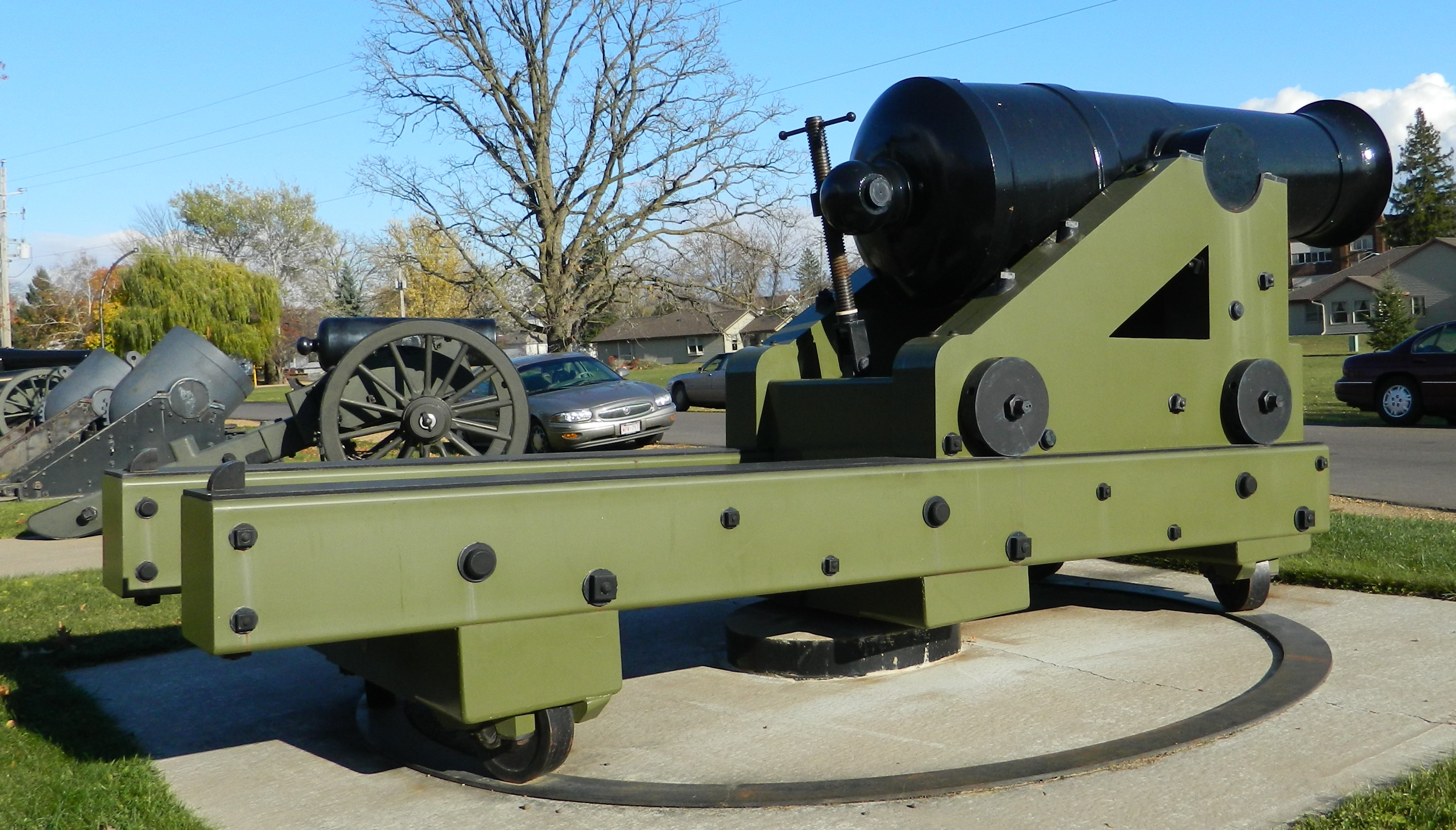
50-pounder Model 1811 Columbiad (7.25 inch or 184 mm bore) and center-pivot mounting designed by George Bomford as an experimental coastal defense gun. This gun was built in 1811 as a component of the Second System of US fortifications.

One of the first recorded uses of coastal artillery was in 1381—during the war between Ferdinand I of Portugal and Henry II of Castile—when the troops of the King of Portugal used cannons to defend Lisbon against an attack from the Castilian naval fleet.

The use of coastal artillery expanded during the Age of Discoveries, in the 16th century; when a colonial power took over an overseas territory, one of their first tasks was to build a coastal fortress, both to deter rival naval powers and to subjugate the natives. The Martello tower is an excellent example of a widely used coastal fort that mounted defensive artillery, in this case, muzzle-loading cannon. During the 19th century, the Chinese Qing Dynasty also built hundreds of coastal fortresses in an attempt to counter Western naval threats.

Coastal artillery fortifications generally followed the development of land fortifications; sometimes separate land defence forts were built to protect coastal forts. Through the middle 19th century, coastal forts could be bastion forts, star forts, polygonal forts, or sea forts, the first three types often with detached gun batteries called "water batteries". Coastal defence weapons throughout history were heavy naval guns or weapons based on them, often supplemented by lighter weapons. In the late 19th century, separate batteries of coastal artillery replaced forts in some countries; in some areas, these became widely separated geographically through the mid-20th century as weapon ranges increased. The amount of landward defence provided began to vary by country from the late 19th century; by 1900, new US forts almost totally neglected these defences. Booms were also usually part of a protected harbor's defences. In the middle 19th century underwater minefields and later controlled mines were often used, or stored in peacetime to be available in wartime. With the rise of the submarine threat at the beginning of the 20th century, anti-submarine nets were used extensively, usually added to boom defences, with major warships often being equipped with them (to allow rapid deployment once the ship was anchored or moored) through early World War I. In World War I railway artillery emerged and soon became part of coastal artillery in some countries; with railway artillery in coast defence some type of revolving mount had to be provided to allow tracking of fast-moving targets.

Coastal artillery could be part of the Navy (as in Scandinavian countries, wartime Germany, and the Soviet Union), or part of the Army (as in the Anglosphere alignment for significant English-speaking countries). In English-speaking countries, certain coastal artillery positions were sometimes referred to as 'Land Batteries', distinguishing this form of artillery battery from for example floating batteries. In the United Kingdom, in the later 19th and earlier 20th Centuries, the land batteries of the coastal artillery were the responsibility of the Royal Garrison Artillery.

In the United States, coastal artillery was established in 1794 as a branch of the Army and a series of construction programs of coastal defenses began: the "First System" in 1794, the "Second System" in 1804, and the "Third System" or "Permanent System" in 1816. Masonry forts were determined to be obsolete following the American Civil War, and a postwar program of earthwork defenses was poorly funded. In 1885 the Endicott Board recommended an extensive program of new U.S. harbor defenses, featuring new rifled artillery and minefield defenses; most of the board's recommendations were implemented. Construction on these was initially slow, as new weapons and systems were developed from scratch, but was greatly hastened following the Spanish–American War of 1898. Shortly thereafter, in 1907, Congress split the field artillery and coast artillery into separate branches, creating a separate Coast Artillery Corps (CAC) The CAC was disbanded as a separate branch in 1950.

In the first decade of the 20th century, the United States Marine Corps established the Advanced Base Force. The force was used for setting up and defending advanced overseas bases, and its close ties to the Navy allowed it to man coast artillery around these bases.

=== Russo-Japanese War ===
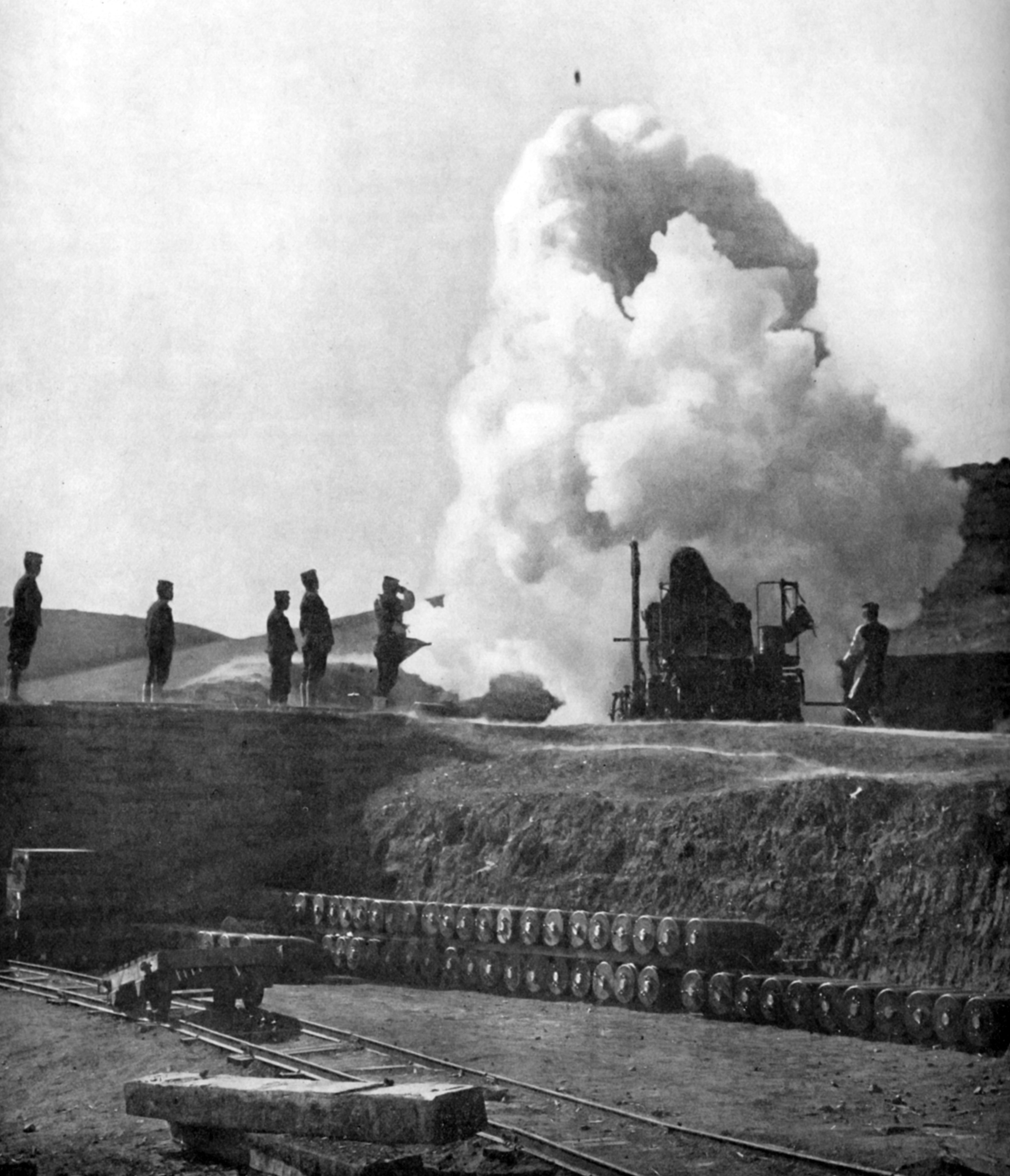
Japanese 11-inch howitzer firing; shell visible in flight

During the Siege of Port Arthur, Imperial Japanese forces had captured the vantage point on 203 Meter Hill overlooking Port Arthur harbor. After relocating heavy 11-inch (280 mm) howitzers with 500 pound (~220 kg) armor-piercing shells to the summit of the Hill, the Japanese bombarded the Russian fleet in the harbor, systematically sinking the Russian ships within range. The Japanese were attacking the city and the Russian ships were trapped in the harbor due to mines, making this one of the few cases of coastal guns being employed in an offensive action.

On December 5, 1904, the battleship Poltava was destroyed, followed by the battleship Retvizan on December 7, 1904, the battleships Pobeda and Peresvet and the cruisers Pallada and Bayan on December 9, 1904. The battleship Sevastopol, although hit 5 times by 11-inch (280 mm) shells, managed to move out of range of the guns. Stung by the fact that the Russian Pacific Fleet had been sunk by the Imperial Japanese Army and not by the Imperial Japanese Navy, and with a direct order from Tokyo that the Sevastopol was not to be allowed to escape, Admiral Togo sent in wave after wave of destroyers in six separate attacks on the sole remaining Russian battleship. After 3 weeks, the Sevastopol was still afloat, having survived 124 torpedoes fired at her while sinking two Japanese destroyers and damaging six other vessels. The Japanese had meanwhile lost the cruiser Takasago to a mine outside the harbor.

=== World War II ===
==== Poland ====
On September 1, 1939, the Wehrmacht began their attack on Poland. The Artillery Battery No. 31, part of the Coastal Artillery Division, immediately took over a huge part of the burden of defending the Polish coast, preventing German ships from approaching the Hel Peninsula.

On September 3, an artillery duel took place between the Polish coastal batteries, ORP Gryf and ORP Wicher, and the German destroyers Leberecht Maass and Wolfgang Zenker. After a 15-minute exchange of fire, Leberecht Maass was hit in the gun mask, with several wounded sailors (this fact was reported by both the commander of the Laskowski battery, Captain Zbigniew Przybyszewski, and the German Rear Admiral Lütjens). The German destroyers set up a smoke screen and withdrew from the fight.

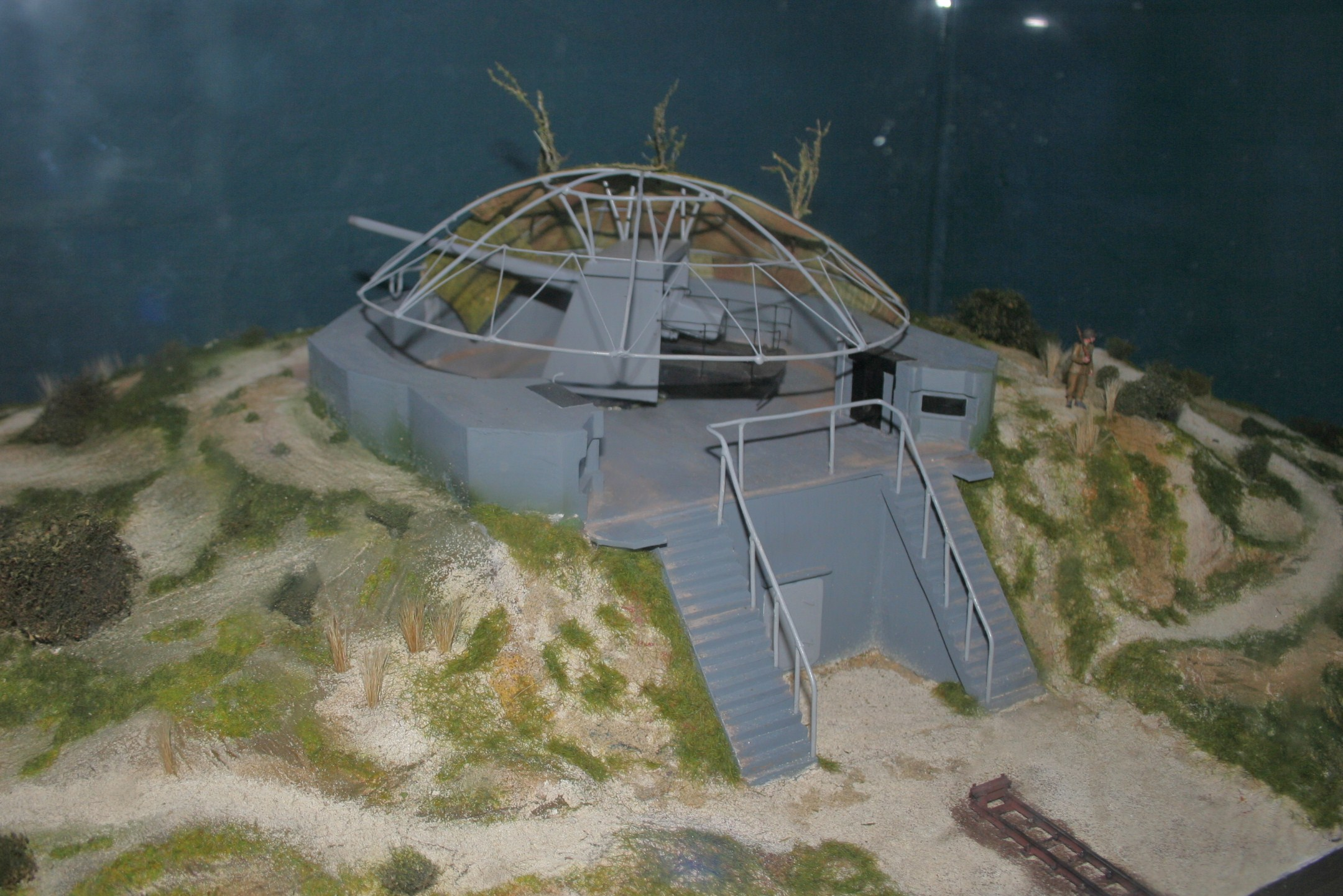
A model of site no. 4 Heliodor Laskowski's Artillery Battery No. 31 (XXXI)

On 19 September, the battery of the Heliodor Laskowski fired at a group of units trawling and shelling the defenses on Kępa Oksywska: M 3, "Nettelbeck", "Fuchs", S.V.K. Verband (6 ships), 1st Minesweeper Flotilla (5 ships).

In the morning of 25 September, the battleships SMS Schleswig-Holstein and SMS Schlesien began shelling the Hel Fortified Area with 280mm shells. One of them hit the concrete platform of gun no. 3 of the Heliodor Laskowski battery, killing two sailors and seriously wounding several others. The explosion damaged the camouflage, and debris and shrapnel blocked the gun mechanisms. Another shell temporarily immobilized gun no. 1, and one of the shrapnel wounded the fire director on the unprotected turret, Captain Przybyszewski. The remaining two undamaged guns of the coastal battery fire continuously, obtaining cover for the German battleship SMS Schlesien, which is laying a smoke screen. The Hel battery transfers fire to the battleship SMS Schleswig-Holstein. At 11:18, both German ships break off the duel and withdraw beyond the range of the Polish battery. The German ships fired a total of 159 shells of 280 mm caliber and 209 shells of 150 mm caliber. The two damaged guns of the Laskowski battery were soon put into operation, and the wounded commander was replaced by Captain Bohdan Mańkowski. On September 28, Captain Przybyszewski leaves the hospital against the doctors' prohibition and returned with his hand in a sling to command the battery.

In another artillery duel, which took place on September 27, Laskowski's battery scored a direct hit on the battleship's starboard artillery casemate, SMS Schleswig-Holstein, wounding 14 members of its crew.

==== Norway ====
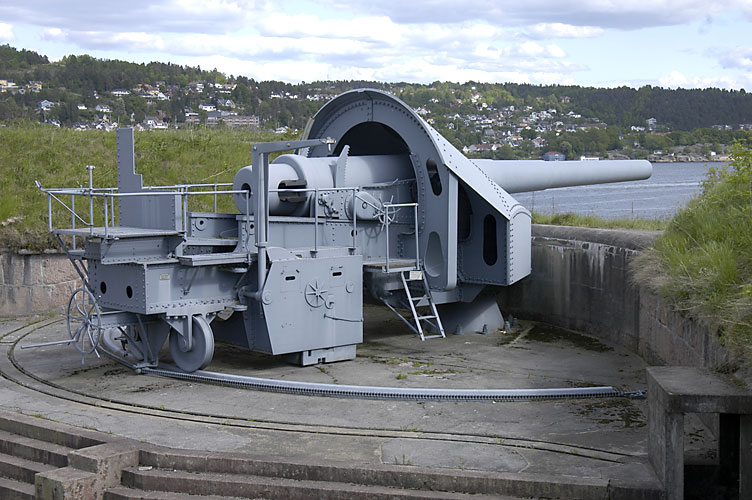
One of the three 28 cm main battery guns at Oscarsborg

During the Battle of Drøbak Sound in April 1940, the German navy lost the new heavy cruiser Blücher, one of their most modern ships, to a combination of fire from various coastal artillery emplacements, including two obsolete German-made Krupp 280 mm (11 in) guns and equally obsolete Whitehead torpedoes. The Blücher had entered the narrow waters of the Oslofjord, carrying 1,000 soldiers and leading a German invasion fleet. The first salvo from the Norwegian defenders, fired from Oscarsborg Fortress about 950 meters away, disabled the center propeller turbine and set her afire.

Fire from the smaller guns (57 mm to 150 mm) swept her decks and disabled her steering, and she received two torpedo hits before the fires reached her magazines and doomed her. As a result, the remainder of the invasion fleet reversed, the Norwegian royal family, parliament and cabinet escaped, and the Norwegian gold reserves were safely removed from the city before it fell.

==== Singapore ====
Singapore was defended by its famous large-caliber coastal guns, which included one battery of three 15-inch (381 mm) guns and one with two 15-inch (381 mm) guns. Prime Minister Winston Churchill nicknamed the garrison as "The Gibraltar of the East" and the "Lion of the Sea". This perhaps compelled the Imperial Japanese Army to launch their invasion of Singapore from the north, via Malaya, in December 1941.

It is a commonly repeated misconception that Singapore's large-calibre coastal guns were ineffective against the Japanese because they were designed to face south to defend the harbour against naval attack and could not be turned round to face north. In fact, most of the guns could be turned, and were indeed fired at the invaders. However, the guns were supplied mostly with armour-piercing (AP) shells and few high explosive (HE) shells. AP shells were designed to penetrate the hulls of heavily armoured warships and were mostly ineffective against infantry targets. Military analysts later estimated that if the guns had been well supplied with HE shells, the Japanese attackers would have suffered heavy casualties, but the invasion would not have been prevented by this means alone. The guns of Singapore achieved their purpose in deterring a Japanese naval attack, as the possibility of an expensive capital ship being sunk made it inadvisable for the Japanese to attack Singapore via the sea. The fact that the Japanese army chose to advance down from Thailand through Malaya to take Singapore was a testament to the respect the Japanese had for the coastal artillery at Singapore. However, the lack of HE shells rendered Singapore vulnerable to a land-based attack from Malaya via the Johore Straits.

==== Pacific ====
In December 1941, during the Battle of Wake Island, US Marine defense battalions fired at the Japanese invasion fleet with six 5-inch (127 mm) guns, sinking the Japanese destroyer Hayate by scoring direct hits on her magazines, and scoring eleven hits on the light cruiser Yubari, forcing her to withdraw, and temporarily repulsing Japanese efforts to take the island.

The Harbor Defenses of Manila and Subic Bays denied Manila harbor to the invading Japanese until Corregidor fell to amphibious assault on 6 May 1942, nearly a month after the fall of Bataan. Beyond tying up besieging Japanese forces (who suffered severe supply shortages due to the inability to use Manila as a port), the forts allowed interception of radio traffic later decisive at Midway.

The Japanese defended the island of Betio in the Tarawa atoll with numerous 203 mm (8-inch) coastal guns. In 1943, these were knocked out early in the battle with a combined USN naval and aerial bombardment.

==== Atlantic Wall ====
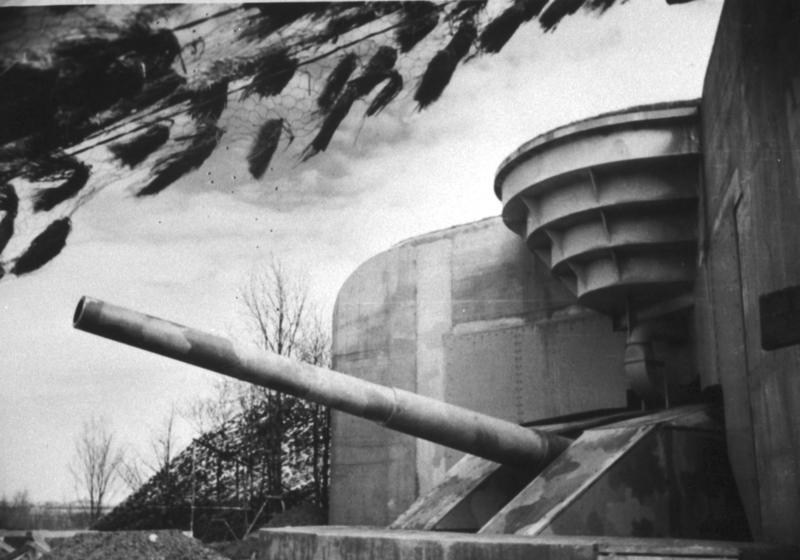
A 38 cm gun of Batterie Todt

Nazi Germany fortified its conquered territories with the Atlantic Wall. Organization Todt built a string of reinforced concrete pillboxes and bunkers along the beaches, or sometimes slightly inland, to house machine guns, antitank guns, and artillery ranging in size up to the large 40.6 cm naval guns. The intent was to destroy Allied landing craft before they could unload. During the Normandy Landings in 1944, shore bombardment was given high importance, using ships from battleships to destroyers and landing craft. For example, the Canadians at Juno beach had fire support many times greater than they had had for the Dieppe Raid in 1942.

The old battleships HMS Ramillies and Warspite with the monitor HMS Roberts were used to suppress shore batteries east of the Orne; cruisers targeted shore batteries at Ver-sur-Mer and Moulineaux; while eleven destroyers provided local fire support. The (equally old) battleship Texas was used to suppress the battery at Pointe du Hoc, but the guns there had been moved to an inland position, unbeknownst to the Allies. In addition, there were modified landing craft: eight "Landing Craft Gun", each with two 4.7-inch guns; four "Landing Craft Support" with automatic cannon; eight Landing Craft Tank (Rocket), each with a single salvo of 1,100 5-inch rockets; eight Landing Craft Assault (Hedgerow), each with twenty-four bombs intended to detonate beach mines prematurely. Twenty-four Landing Craft Tank carried Priest self-propelled 105mm howitzers which also fired while they were on the run-in to the beach. Similar arrangements existed at other beaches.

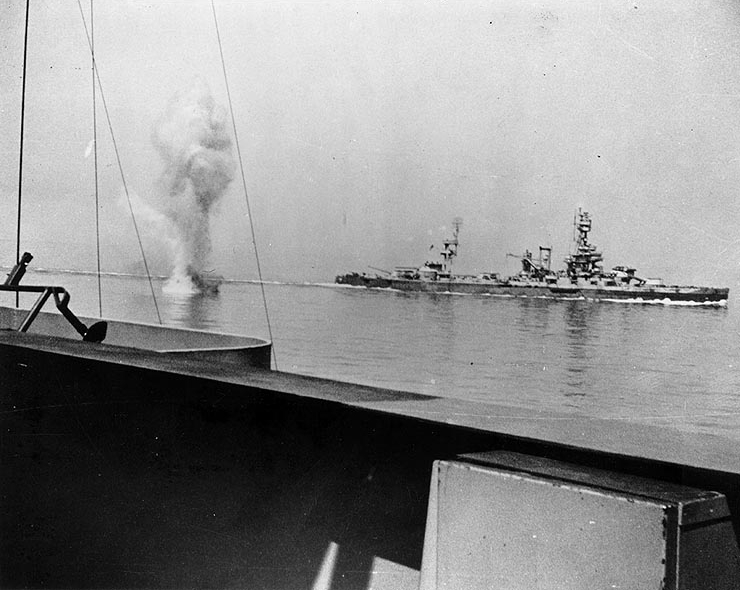
240 mm (9.4 in) shell from Battery Hamburg lands near USS Texas during the Bombardment of Cherbourg

On June 25, 1944, the American battleship Texas engaged German shore batteries on the Cotentin Peninsula around Cherbourg. Battery Hamburg straddled the ship with a salvo of 240 mm shells, eventually hitting Texas twice; one shell damaged the conning tower and navigation bridge, with the other penetrating below decks but failing to explode. Return fire from Texas knocked out the German battery.

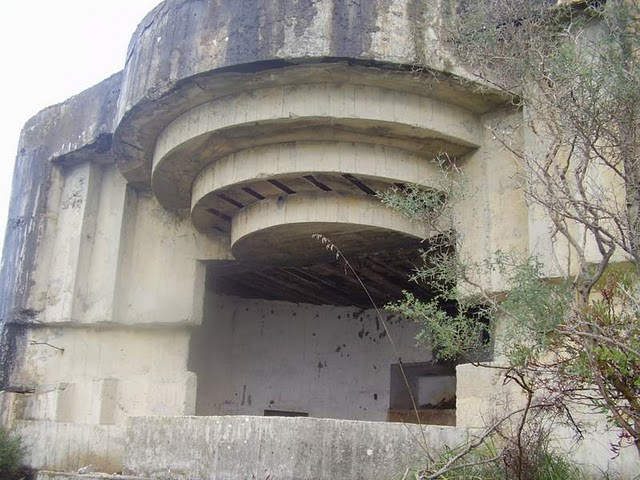
Blockhouse for 152 mm gun, near Camogli. Part of the complex called Ligurian Wall.

Allied efforts to take the port of Toulon in August 1944 ran into "Big Willie", a battery consisting of two prewar French turrets, equipped with the guns taken from the French battleship Provence, each mounting a pair of 340 mm naval guns. The range and power of these guns was such that the Allies dedicated a battleship or heavy cruiser to shelling the fort every day, with the battleship Nevada eventually silencing the guns on August 23, 1944.

=== Post-World War II ===
After World War II the advent of jet aircraft and guided missiles reduced the role of coastal artillery in defending a country against air and sea attacks while also rendering fixed artillery emplacements vulnerable to enemy strikes.

The Scandinavian countries, with their long coastlines and relatively weak navies, continued in the development and installation of modern coastal artillery systems, usually hidden in well-camouflaged armored turrets (for example Swedish 12 cm automatic turret gun). In these countries, the coastal artillery was part of the naval forces and used naval targeting systems. Both mobile and stationary (e.g. 100 56 TK) systems were used.

In countries where coastal artillery has not been disbanded, these forces have acquired amphibious or anti-ship missile capabilities. In constricted waters, mobile coastal artillery armed with surface-to-surface missiles still can be used to deny the use of sea lanes. The Type 88 surface-to-ship missile is an example of modern mobile coastal artillery. Poland also retains a coastal missile division armed with the Naval Strike Missile.

During the Croatian War of Independence in 1991, coastal artillery operated by Croatian forces played an important role in defending Croatian Adriatic coast from Yugoslav naval and air strikes, especially around Zadar, Šibenik and Split, defeating the Yugoslav Navy in the Battle of the Dalmatian Channels.

In practice, there is a distinction between artillery sited to bombard a coastal region and coastal artillery, which has naval-compatible targeting systems and communications that are integrated with the navy rather than the army.

== Examples ==
In the UK

- Admiralty Pier Turret
- Allan Williams turret
- Tyne Turrets
- Cross-Channel guns
- Palmerston Forts
- Needles Battery
- Ness Battery

British Empire

- Castle Islands Fortifications, Fort St. Catherine's, St. David's Battery, Royal Naval Dockyard, Bermuda and nearly a hundred other forts and batteries built in Bermuda between 1612 and 1939.
- Fort Siloso
- Fort Ostenburg
- Fort Queenscliff
- Hobart coastal defences
- Coastal fortifications of New Zealand

United States of America

- Board of Fortifications
- U.S. Army Coast Artillery Corps
- Seacoast defense in the United States
- List of coastal fortifications of the United States
- Battery Chamberlin

Dominion of Canada

- York Redoubt
- Connaught Battery
- Cape Spear
- Fort Amherst

Asia

- Manila and Subic Bays
- Fort Drum (El Fraile Island)
- Fort Mills
- Singapore – consisted of five 15-inch (381 mm) guns
  - Fort Siloso
- Taku Forts

Nazi Germany

- Atlantic Wall
- Hanstholm fortress / Batterie Vara
- Cross-Channel guns
- Battery Lothringen

South & Central America

- Callao
- Fort Copacabana
- Santa Clara Battery
- Valdivian fort system

Australia

- Fort Denison
- Fort Glanville
- Fort Pearce

Other

- Heliodor Laskowski's Artillery Battery No. 31 (XXXI)
- Coastal artillery of the Dardanelles Strait, Ottoman Empire
- German coastal battery Tirpitz near Constanța, Romania
- Swedish Coastal Artillery
- Russian Empire: Peter the Great's Naval Fortress, part of the fortification line protecting Saint Petersburg
- Spanish Army Coastal Artillery, including eighteen 38.1 cm /45 Model 1926 naval gun

== Gallery ==
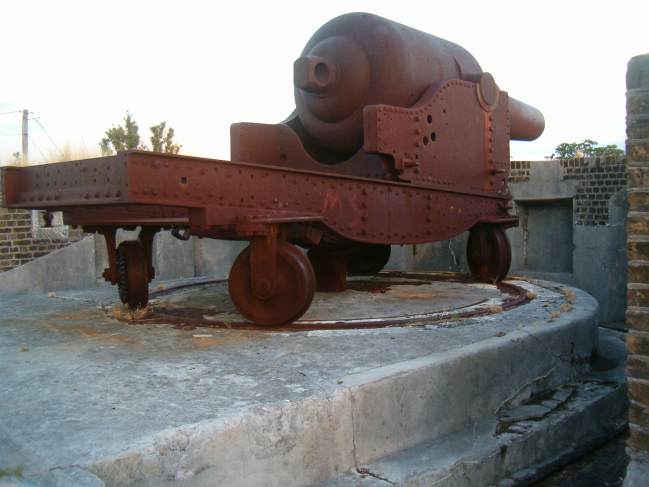
RML 11 inch 25 ton gun at Fort George, Bermuda.

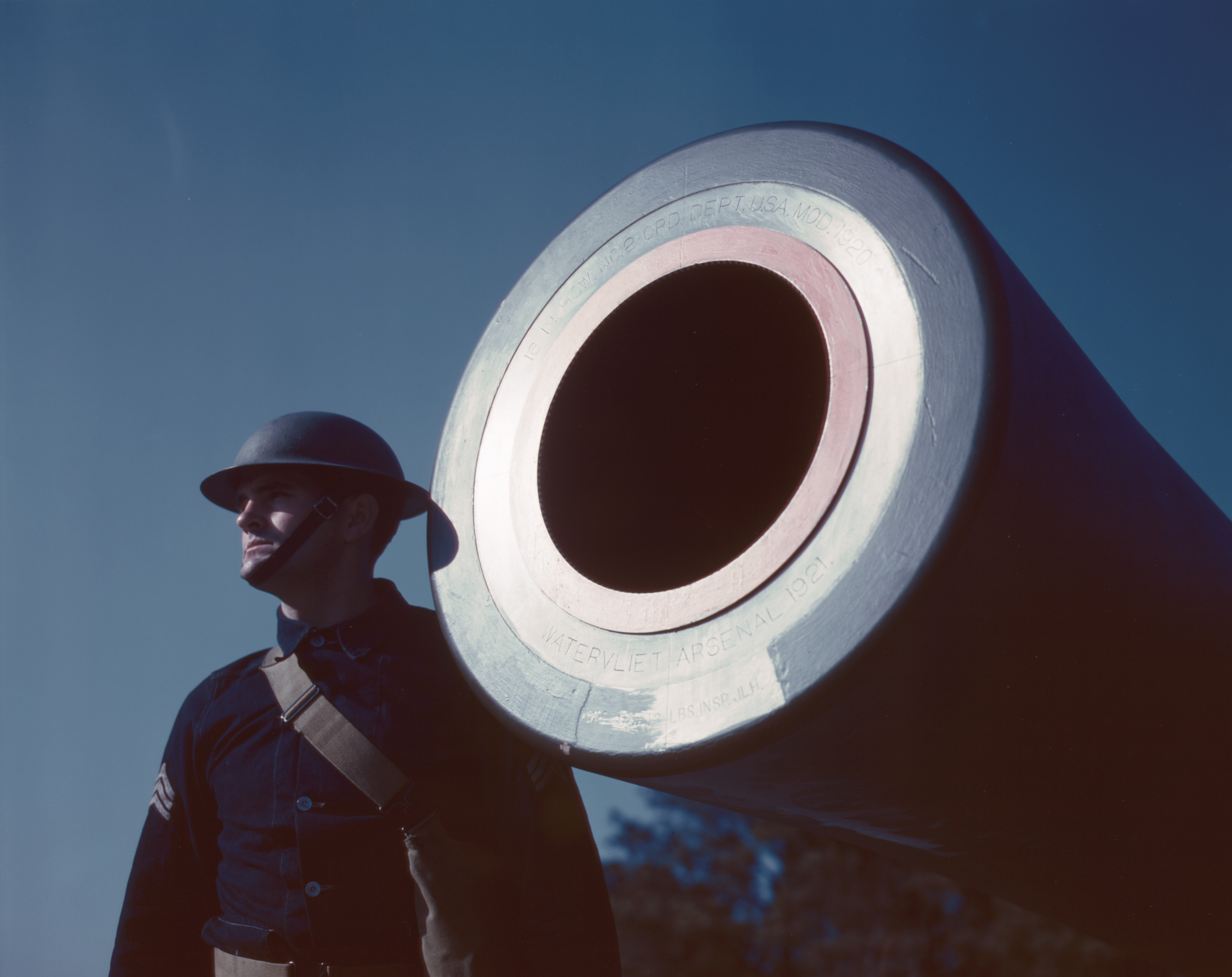
16-inch howitzer M1920, Fort Story, Virginia, USA 1942.

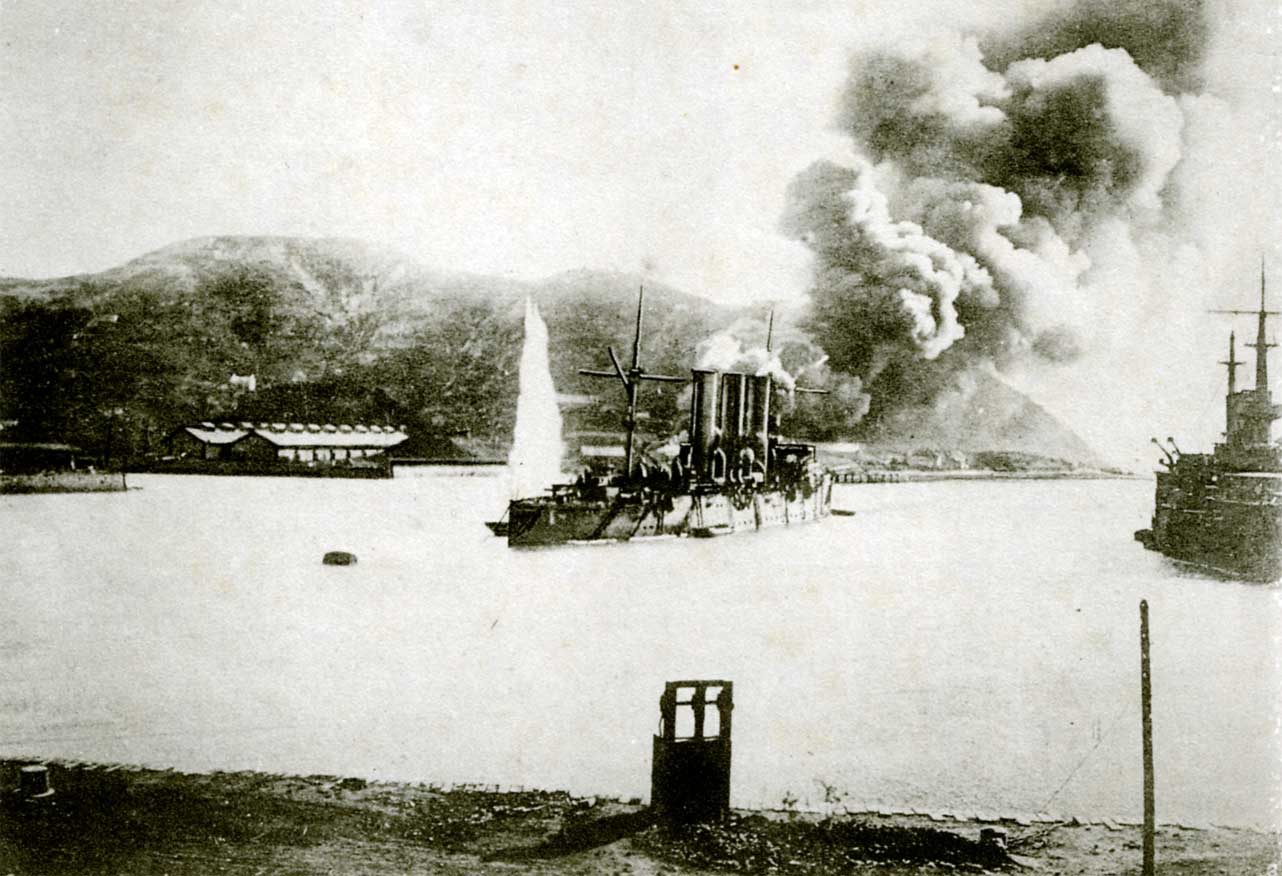
Pallada under fire as the Oil Depot burns

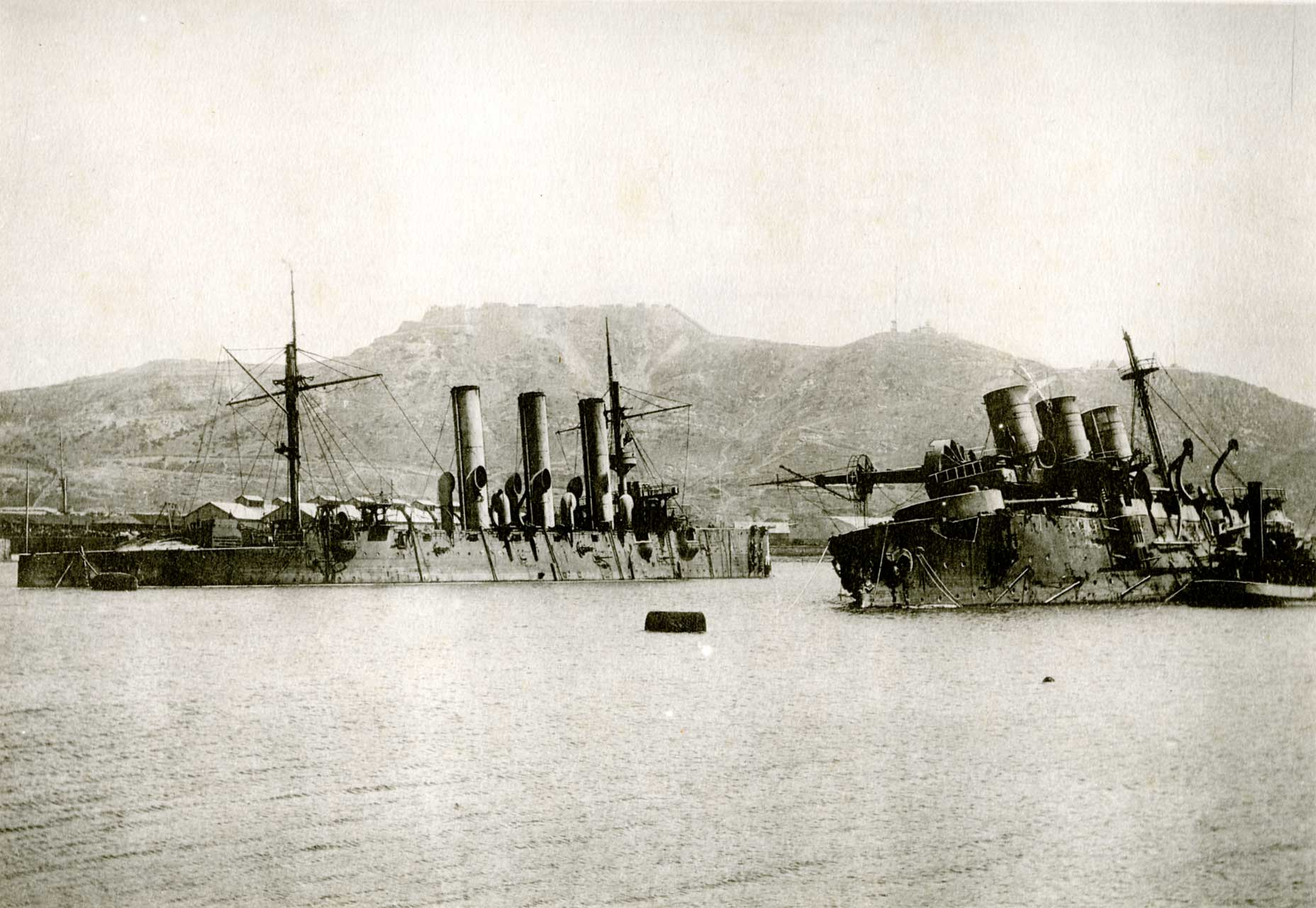
Pallada and Pobeda

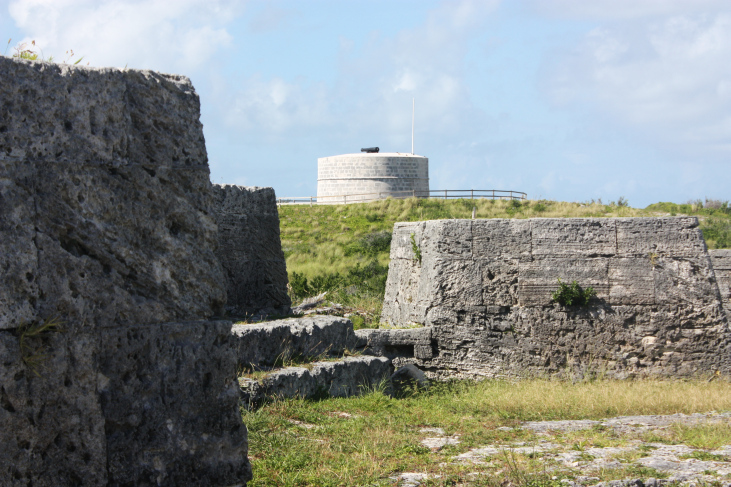
The evolution of coastal fortification design, between the 1790s and 1822, can be discerned between Ferry Island Fort (in the foreground), with multiple guns arrayed to cover the water westward, and the Martello tower in the background, which used a single gun with 360° traverse to cover the area.

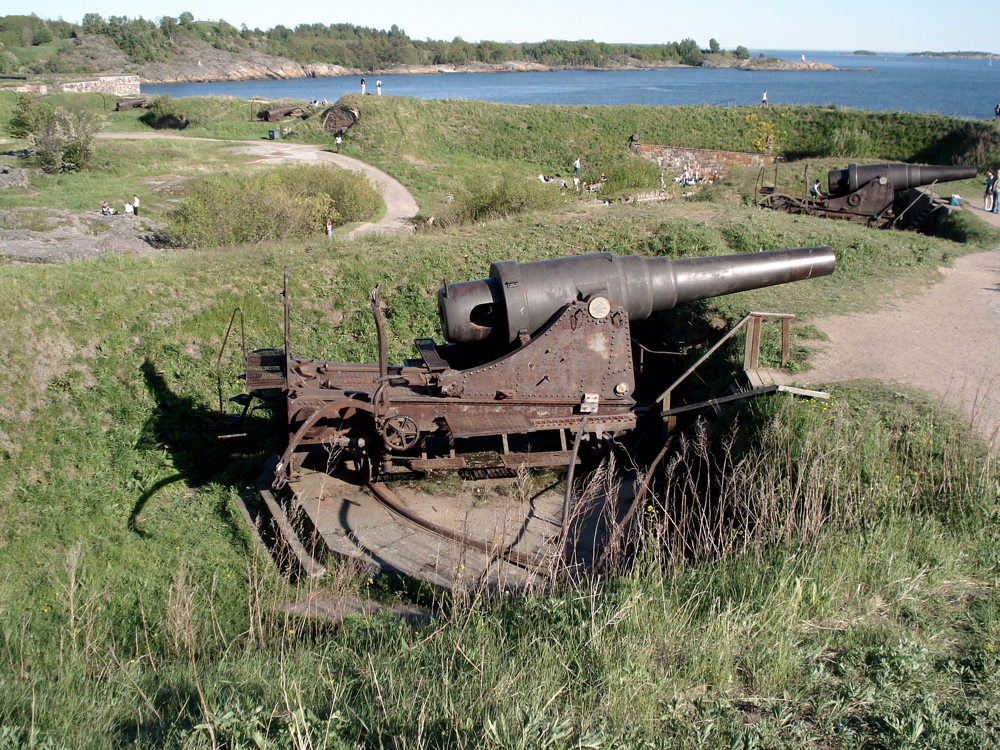
19th-century coastal artillery guns preserved in Suomenlinna fortress in Helsinki.

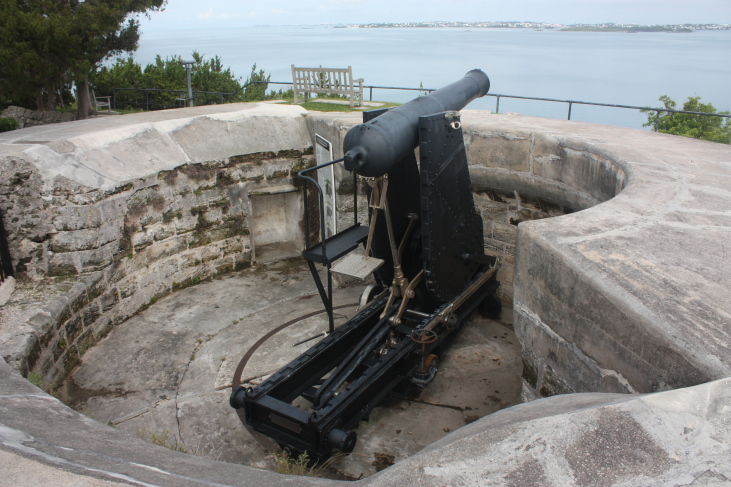
British 64 Pounder RML Gun on a Moncrieff disappearing mount, at Scaur Hill Fort, Bermuda. The fort housed a fixed battery, meant to serve as coastal artillery, as well as guarding against an overland attack.

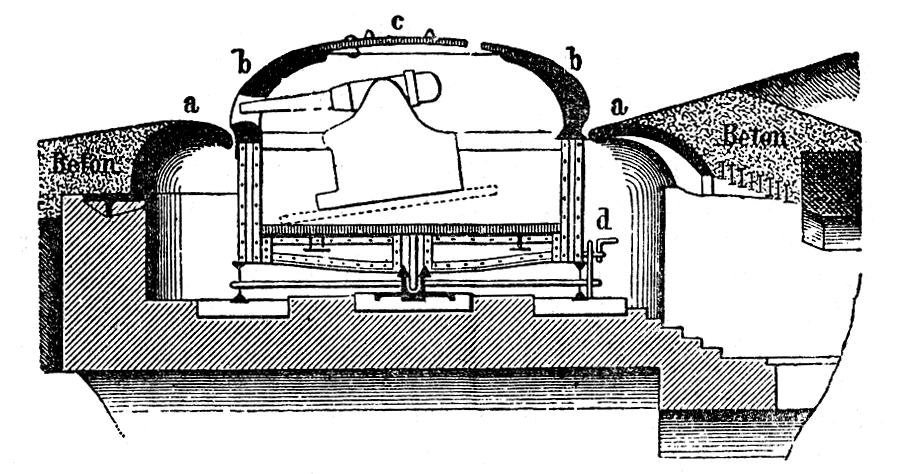
Schematic of a coastal fortification with a rotating gun turret.

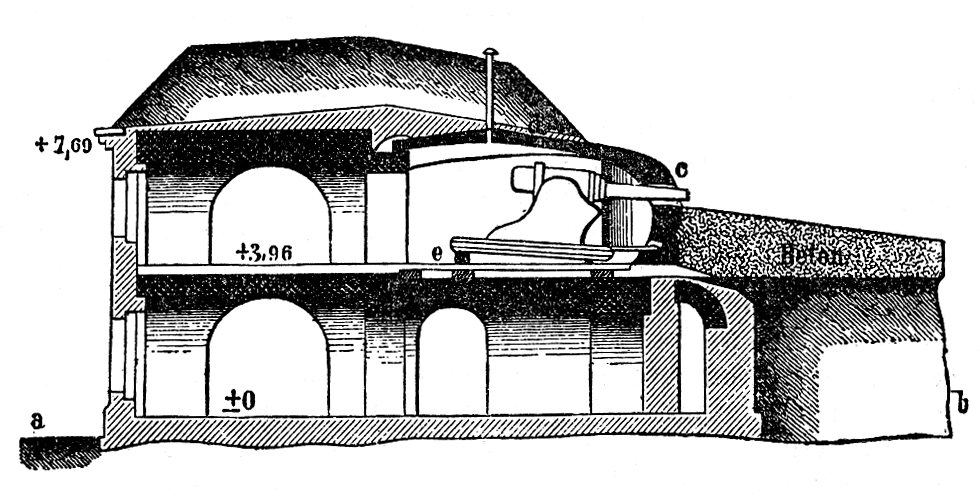
Coastal fortification with fixed guns.

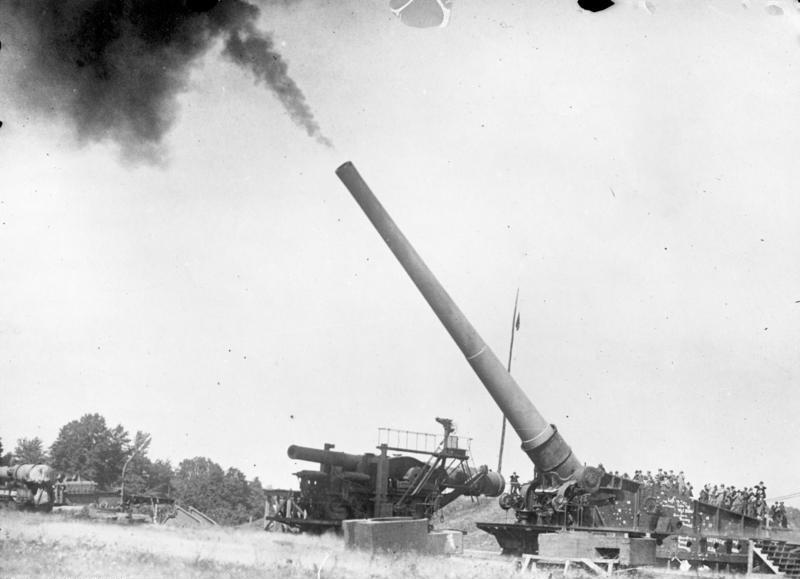
16-inch Navy MkIIMI gun (possibly MkIIIMI) firing from a US Army coast defense mount, 1931. The weapon behind it is on a disappearing carriage.

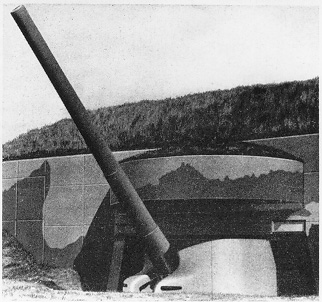
Typical US Army World War II installation of a 16-inch casemated gun.

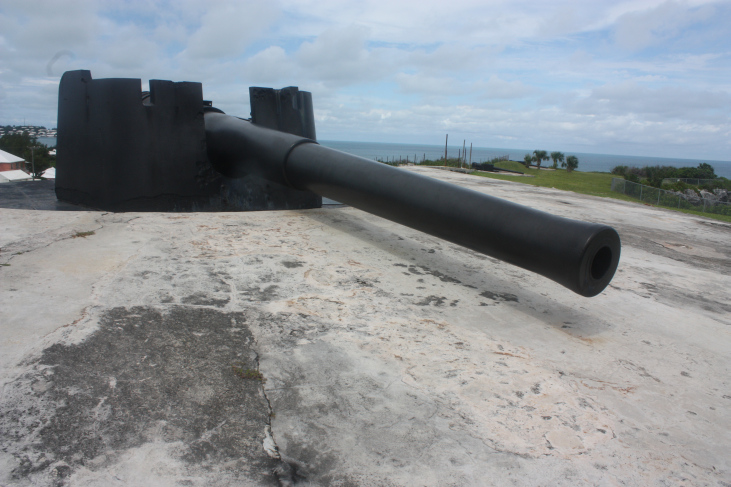
A 9.2" RBL (two 6" RBLs are in background) of the St. David's Battery (or the Examination Battery), St. David's Island, Bermuda in 2011

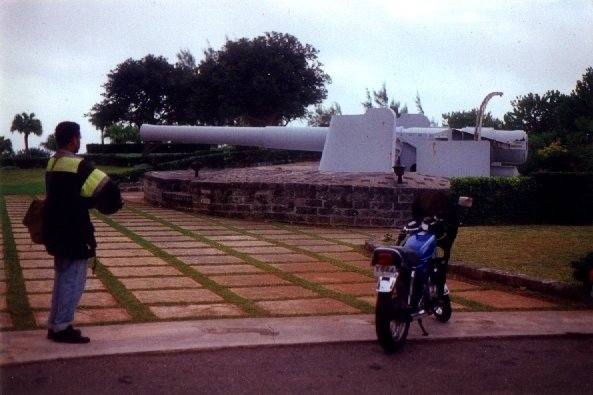
9.2" RBL at Fort Victoria on St. George's Island in Bermuda

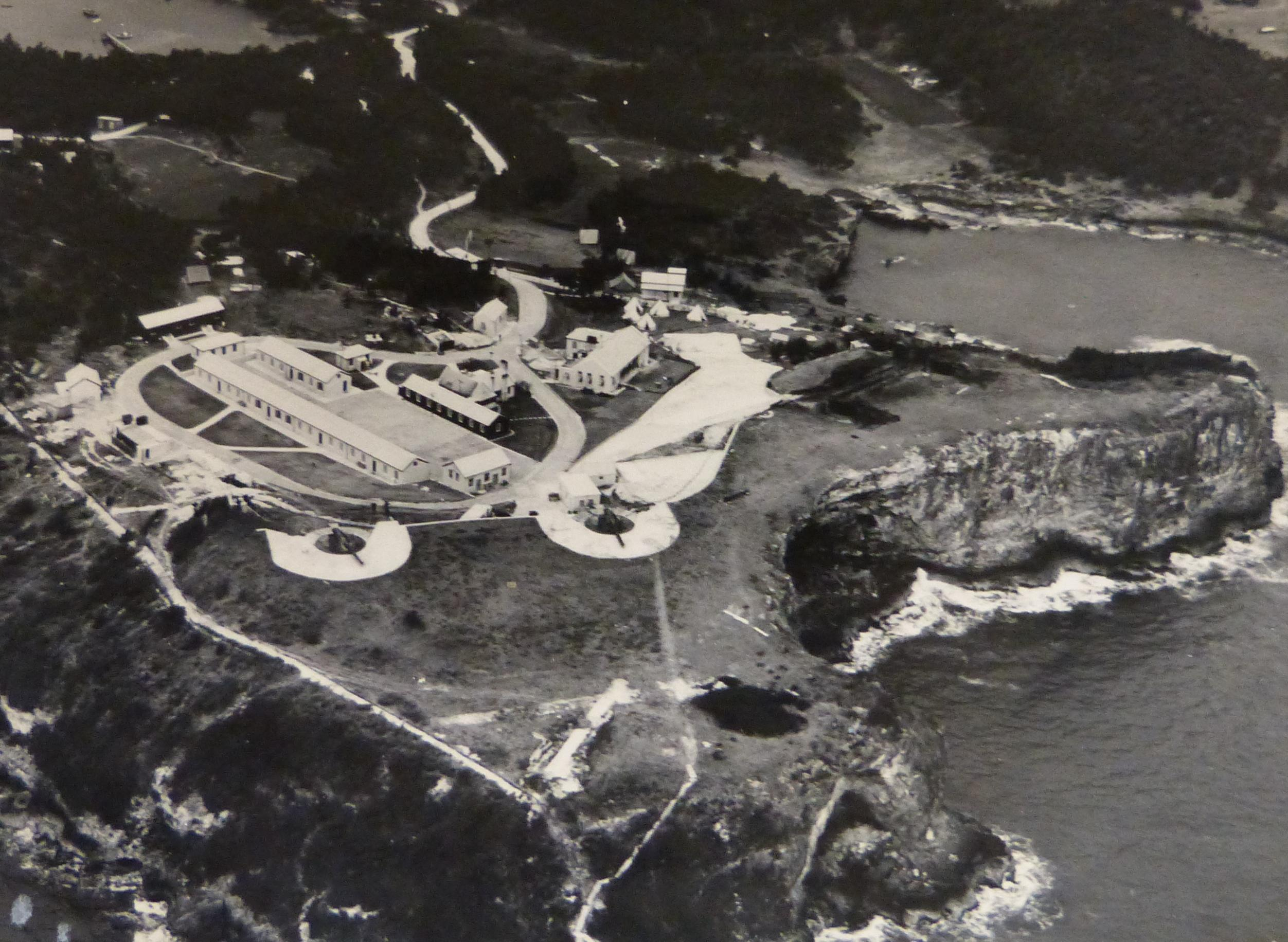
St. David's Battery, Bermuda in 1942, with two 9.2" (left) and two 6" guns

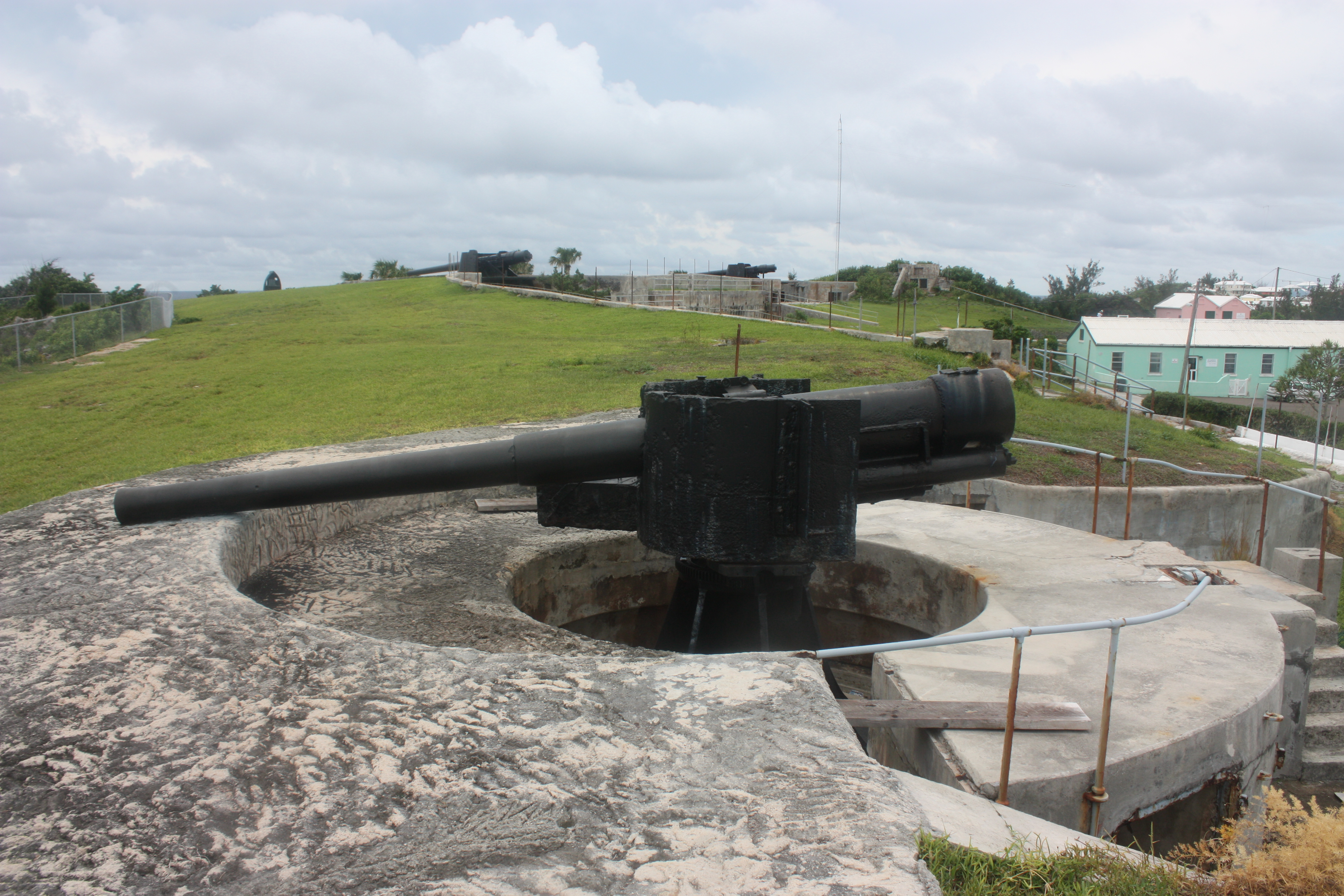
A 6" RBL, and two 9.2" RBLs, at St. David's Battery, in Bermuda, in 2011

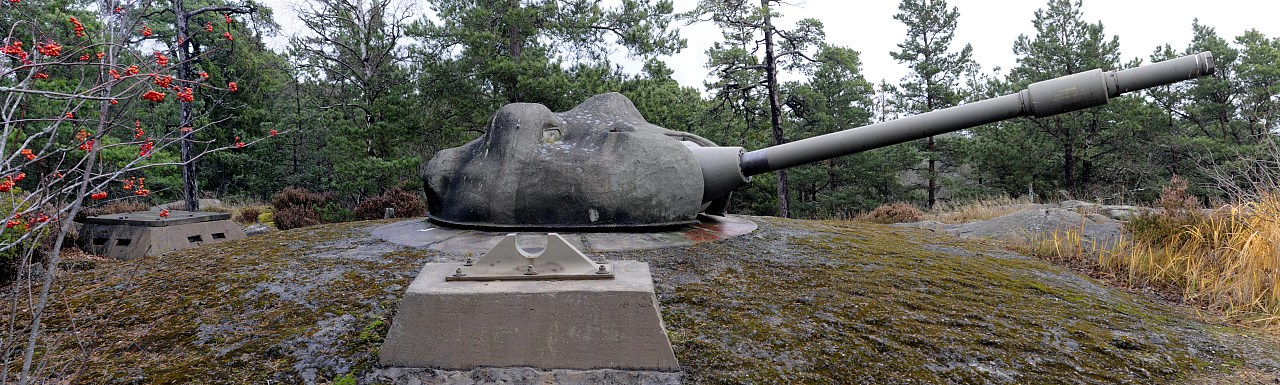
75 mm turret gun model 1957 at Femöre battery, Sweden

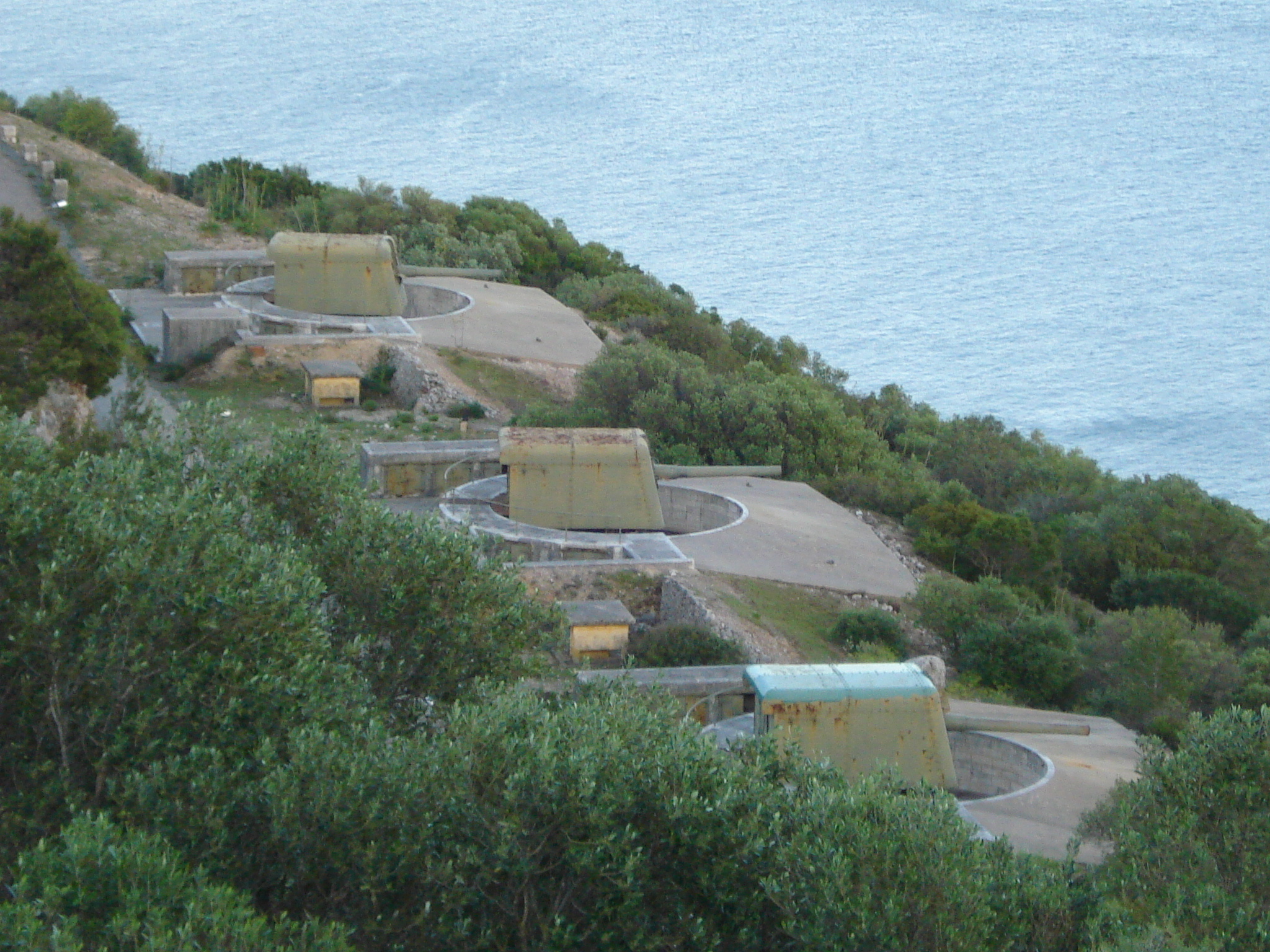
3 abandoned BL 6-inch Mk VII naval gun at 7th coastal artillery battery at Outão, Portugal

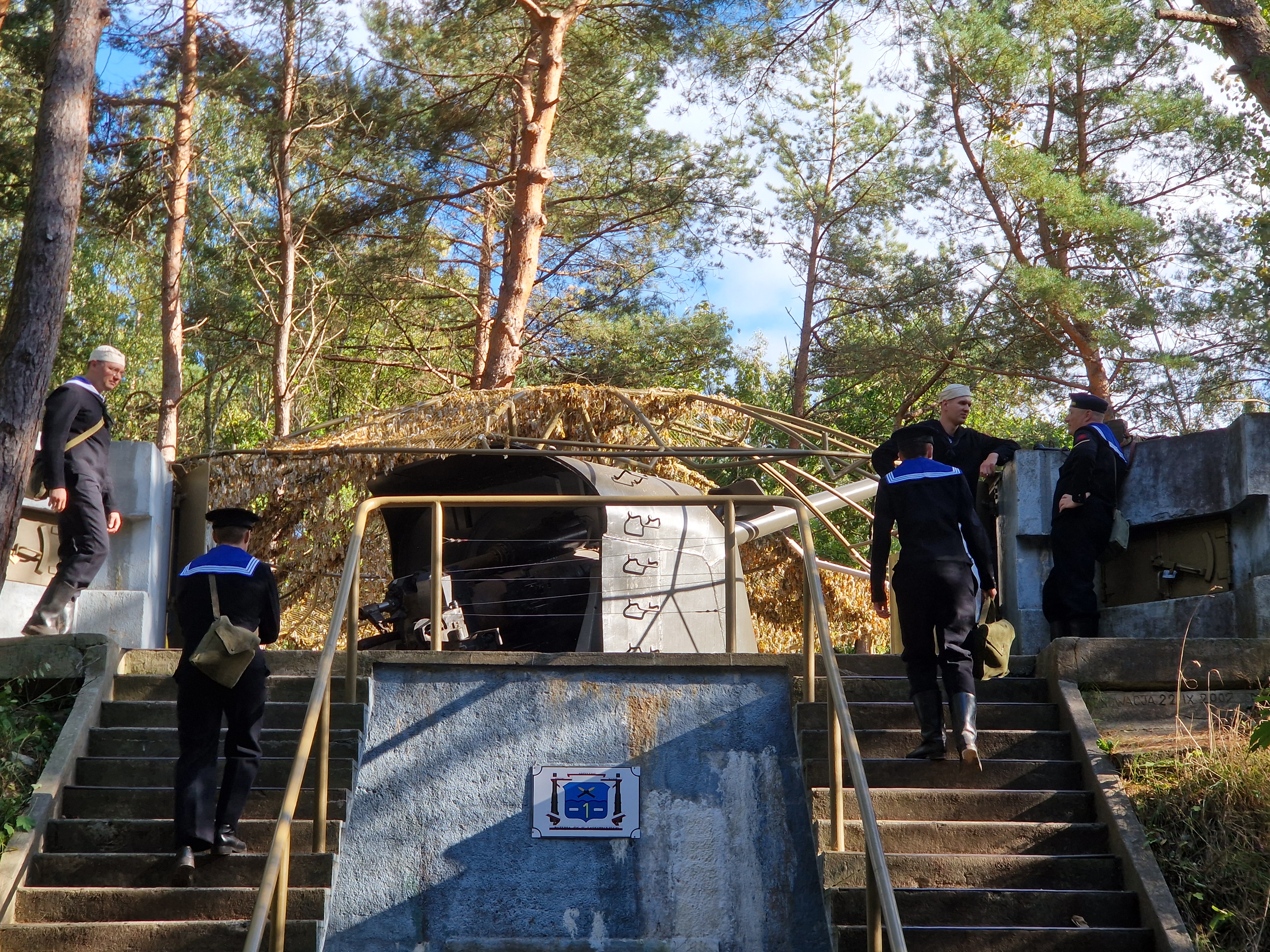
Site no. 4 of the Heliodor Laskowski's battery with 130 mm B-13 gun in Hel, 2024

== See also ==
- Anti-ship ballistic missile
- Artillery
- Coastal defence and fortification
- Disappearing gun
- Gun laying
- List of coastal artillery
- Seacoast defense in the United States

== Books and articles ==
- Chung, Ong Chit (2011). Operation Matador: World War II – Britain's Attempt to Foil the Japanese Invasion of Malaya and Singapore. Hong Kong: Marshall Cavendish International Asia. ISBN 978-9814435444.
