= Femöre battery =

Coastal artillery fort and museum in Sweden

Coordinates: 58°38′53″N 17°06′31″E

- Femörefortet
- Oxelösund, Sverige
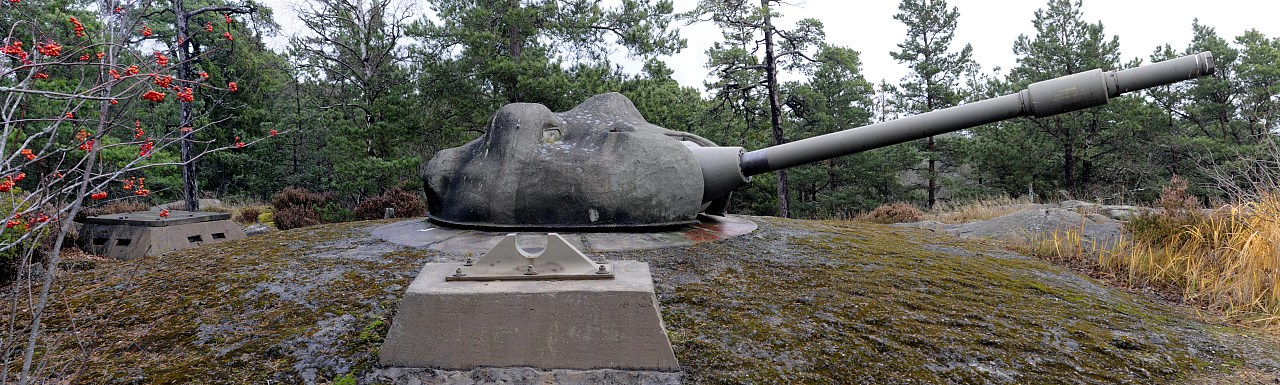
- Canon #3

Site information
- Type: Coastal artillery
- Owner: Swedish Army (1964-2003), The Femörefortet society (2003-today)
- Open to the public: Yes

Site history
- Built: 1964
- In use: 1964-1997

Garrison information
- Garrison: Total of 70. 10 Officers and 60 privates

Femöre battery (Femörefortet) is a facility previously operated by the Swedish Coastal Artillery arm of Swedish Armed Forces. Also known as "Battery OD", it is located only a short trip south-east of Oxelösund on the Swedish east coast, and is blasted into the rock on the Femöre peninsula. The facility totals approx. 3,300 square metres (36,000 ft^{2}) in size, and is connected via an over 450 metres (1,480 ft) long tunnel, stretching across the length of the facility.

The battery was part of a series of similar facilities built during the 1960s and 1970s as a defence against potential attacks from the Soviet Union. Battery OD was the third of a total of 30 forts built in Sweden during the Cold War. The Femöre battery was decommissioned in 1997, and was scheduled for dismantling in 2003. Due to a local interest group, large parts of the fort were instead preserved and are today used as a museum. Since 2003, the battery has been open for regular tours during the summer. The armament consisted of three 7.5 cm tornpjäs m/57, with an effective range of 13 kilometres (8.1 mi).

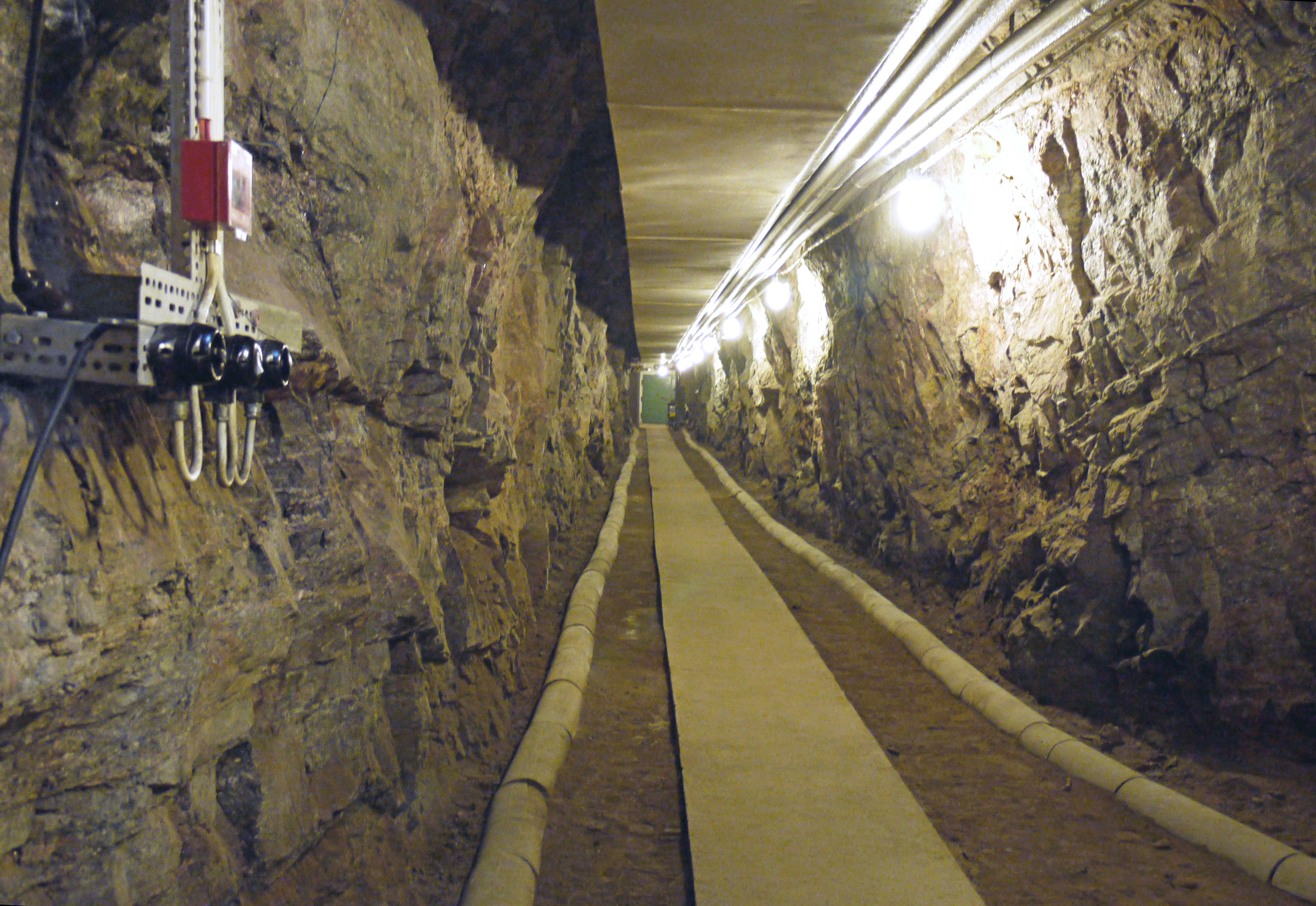
Spine tunnel inside facility

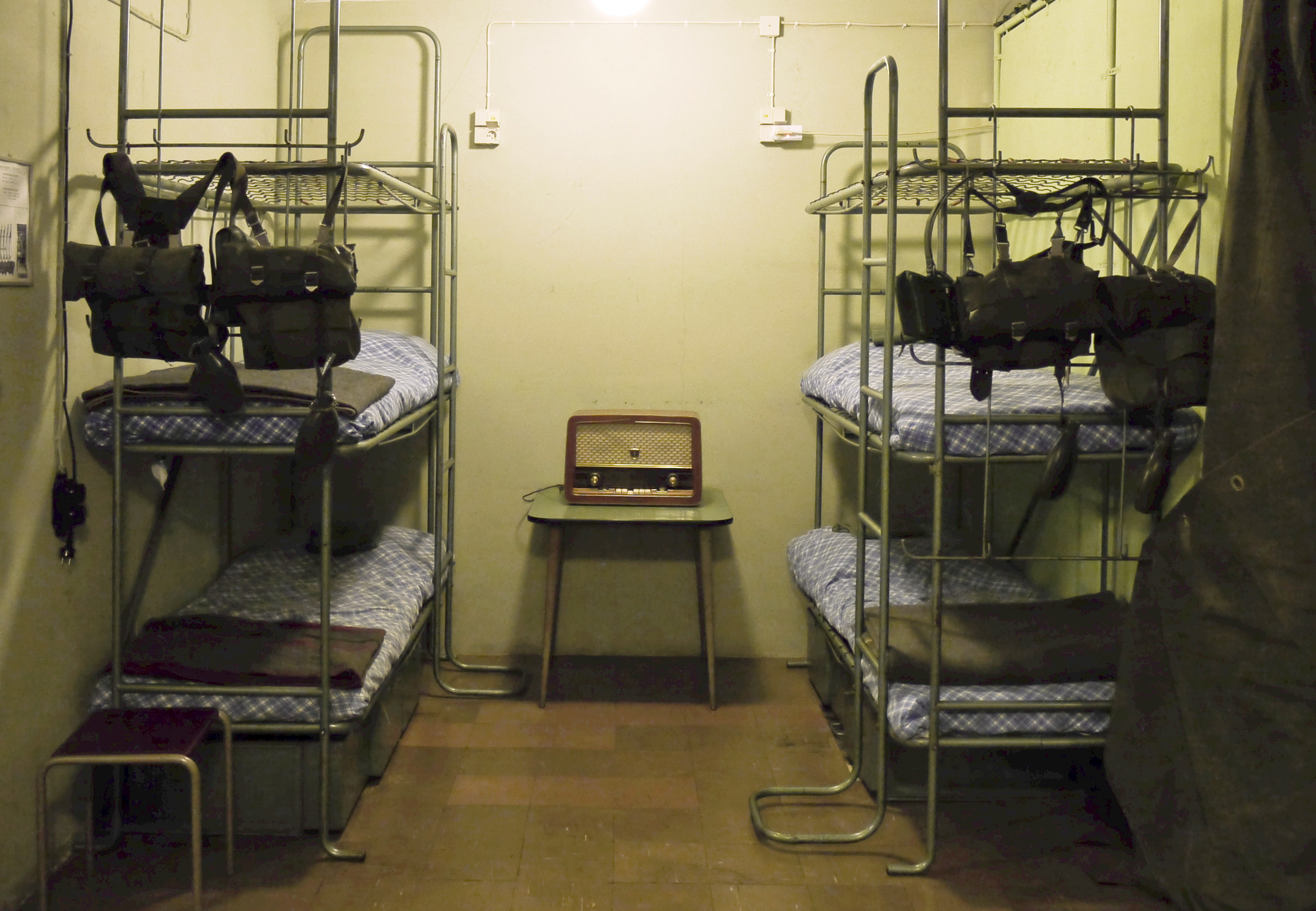
Sleeping quarters

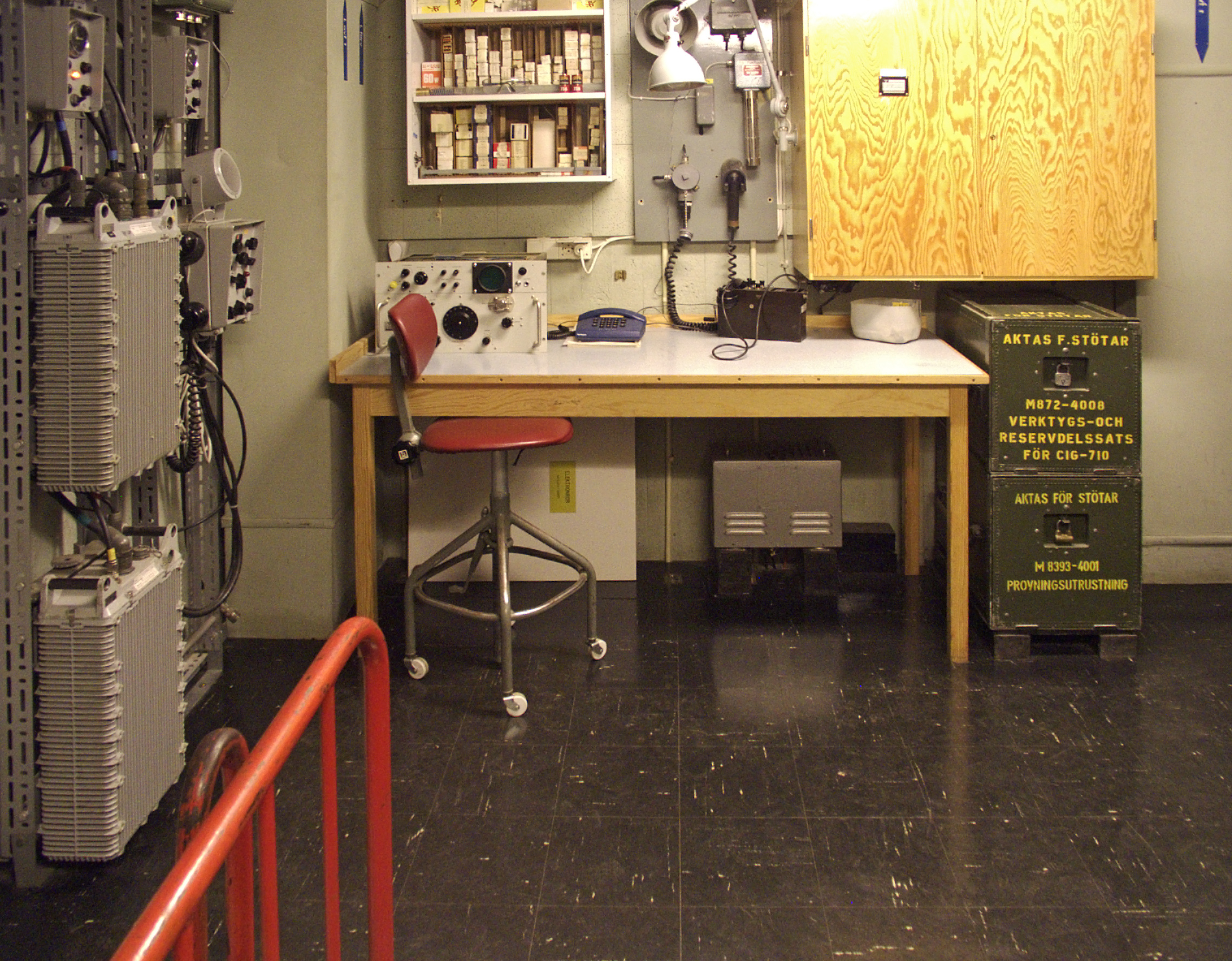
Maintenance room
