= Allan Williams turret =

Circular metal gun emplacement

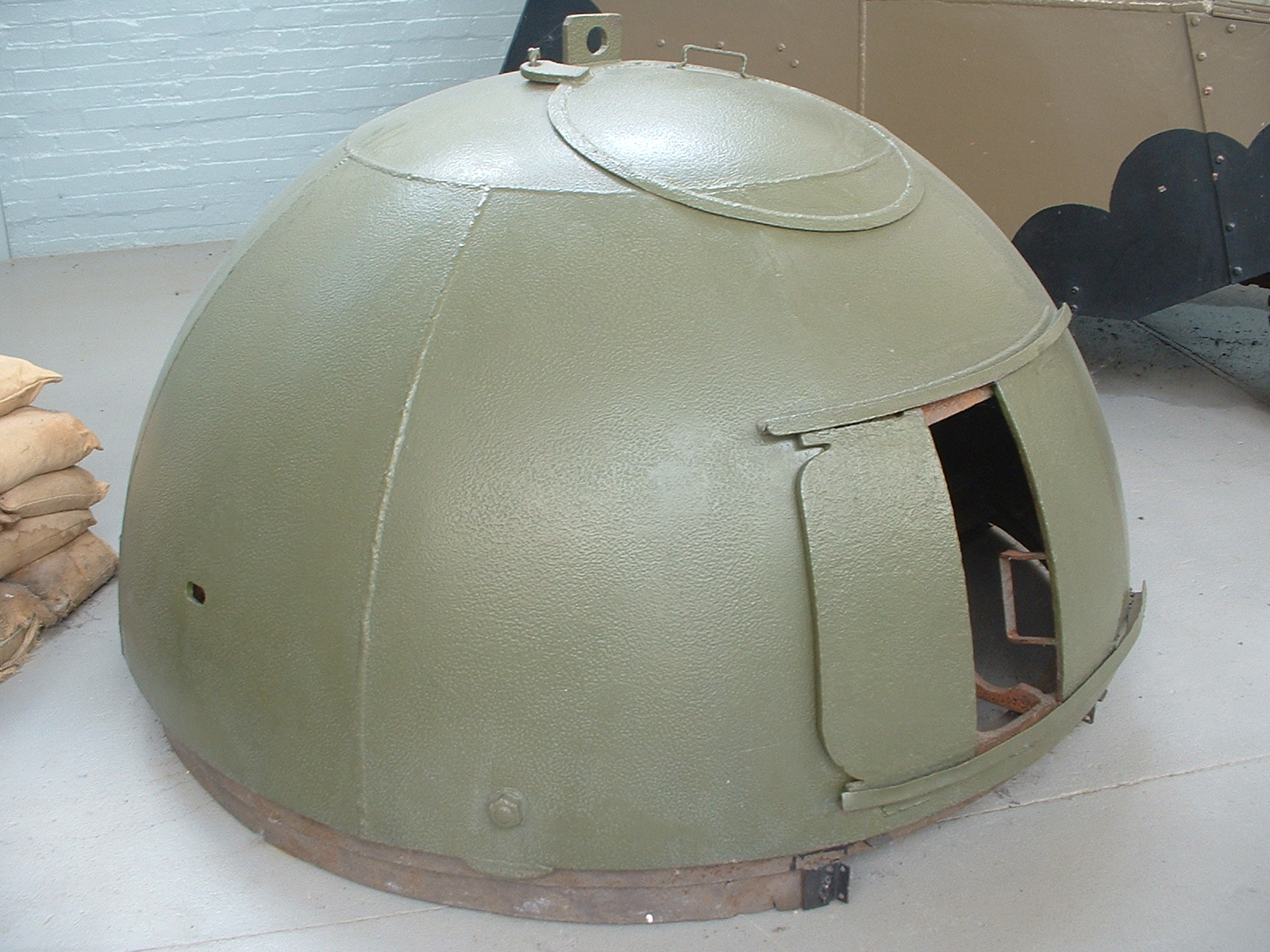
The Allan Williams turret at the Imperial War Museum Duxford, UK

An Allen Williams turret at Worbarrow Bay on the Jurassic Coast in Dorset, England

The Allan Williams turret (aka Alan Williams turret) was a British gun emplacement in the form of a circular metal pillbox, dating from World War II.

The gun turret consisted of a circular wall that was sunk into the ground. On top of this was a rotating steel dome on rollers. A two-man crew could turn the turret by hand to face the enemy, and fire either through a hatch in the side or through the roof. Brackets were included for Bren and Lewis anti-aircraft machine guns, and the Boys anti-tank rifle.

The metal turret could be rotated 360 degrees, giving it an unlimited field of fire. The pit below was lined with steel and brick. It was designed for a machine gun to be fired either through a side loophole, which was protected by shutters, or through a circular opening in the roof, if used in a light anti-aircraft mode. Both the shutters and the circular opening could be closed for protection. The turret was manned by two or, if needed, three men, with folding seats provided inside. The original specification stated that four men could dig the position and erect the turret for use in two hours and then remove it, when needed, in 30 minutes. The diameter of the dome is 1787 mm and the height is 1117 mm.

Only 199 turrets were produced and installed in World War II. Due to the salvaging of metal after the war, only 33 remain in England, and very few are still in situ. A restored example is on display at the Imperial War Museum Duxford. Some are Grade II listed or are part of a Scheduled Monument.

The turret was designed by A.H. Williams in conjunction with Colonel V.T.R. Ford and Lieutenant Williamson. Williams was the managing director of the Rustproof Metal Windows Company in Saltney, Chester, where the turrets were produced. The company had been engaged in war work since 1939, mainly manufacturing ammunition boxes for the Admiralty using a patented galvanising process.

Known survivors include the following: two at North Weald Redoubt, Essex; one on display at the Imperial War Museum Duxford (recovered from an Essex village); one at Worbarrow Bay, near Tyneham, Dorset; one at Seacombe, Dorset; one, above ground but missing its sliding doors, in the grounds of Bayfield Hall, Holt, Norfolk; one on the seawall at Cley next the Sea, Norfolk; two at Cockley Cley, Norfolk; two at Bembridge Fort, Isle of Wight; one at Plymstock quarry, converted into a blast shelter for quarrying (now relocated to Knightstone Tea Rooms at the former World War II RAF Harrowbeer Airfield, near Yelverton, Devon); one at Exmouth seafront, Devon (relocated from docks); one at Builth Wells war memorial, Wales; two on display at Sywell Aviation Museum, Northampton; one at the former RAF Llandwrog near Caernarfon, and one at RAF Dishforth, Thirsk, in North Yorkshire.

== See also ==
- British hardened field defences of World War II
