= 38.1 cm /45 Model 1926 naval gun =

Type of coastal artillery

38.1 cm/45 Model 1926
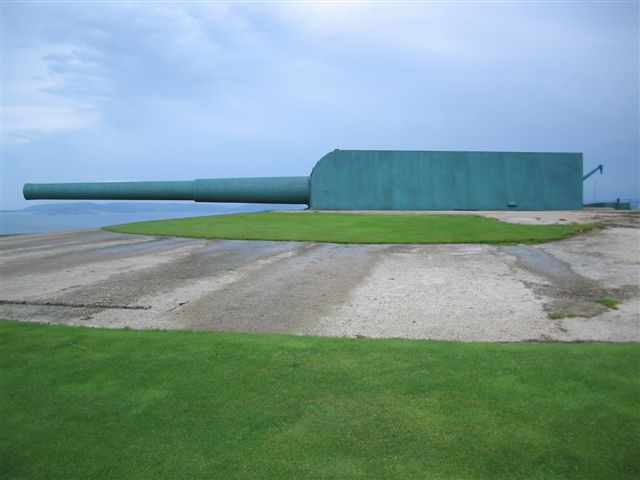
- Surviving Vickers 38.1cm/45 1926 at Monte San Pedro - Coruña
- Type: Coastal artillery
- Place of origin: United Kingdom

Service history
- In service: 1929–2008
- Used by: Spain

Production history
- Designed: 1912
- Manufacturer: Vickers-Armstrong

Specifications
- Mass: 223 tons (227 tonnes)
- Shell: APC, HE
- Shell weight: APC - 1,951 lbs (885 kg), HE - 1,951 lbs (885 kg)
- Caliber: 15 inches (381mm)
- Elevation: -5 / +40 degrees
- Traverse: 300 degrees
- Rate of fire: 2 rounds per minute
- Muzzle velocity: APC - 2,500 fps (762 m/s)
- Effective firing range: 39,390 yards (35,100 m)

The 38.1 cm/45 Model 1926 naval gun, also known as the Vickers-Armstrong 38.1 centimetres (15.0 in) Mark B, was originally intended to form the armament of the Brazilian battleship Riachuelo. Eighteen of the guns were subsequently purchased by Spain for use as coastal artillery.

The guns could fire an armour-piercing shell weighing 860 kilograms (1,900 lb) at a velocity of 762 metres per second (2,500 ft/s) or a high-explosive shell weighing 802 kilograms (1,768 lb) to a range of 35,100 metres (115,200 ft). They were mounted in individual armoured gun houses.

In the 1990s, seven mounts remained operational, and were provided with modern Swedish fire control equipment.

== Locations ==
Cartagena: 4 Guns. Batteries Castillitos and Cenizas, each with 2 guns (Guns still in situ).

Ferrol and A Coruña: Originally 8 guns. Batteries at Cape Prior (Guns scrapped 1997), Monte San Pedro (Guns still in situ), Campelo Alta (Guns transferred 1941) and Lobateiras (Guns removed), each with 2 Guns.

Menorca: Originally 6 guns. Batteries at Favarix (Guns transferred 1944), Mahon and Llucalary (guns still in situ), each with 2 guns.

Subsequently, the guns at Campelo Alta were moved to a new location at Paloma Alta, work being completed in October 1941. One of these guns was destroyed when it suffered a premature detonation during Proof Firing. Later the two guns from the Favarix Battery were transferred, becoming operational in January 1944. These three guns remained in service until 2008, when the last one finally retired into reserve.

== Surviving examples ==
West of Cartagena two guns of the Castillitos Battery :

- 37°32.400′N 1°7.250′W
- 37°32.425′N 1°7.208′W

East of Cartagena two guns of the de Las Cenizas Battery :

- 37°34.718′N 0°49.328′W
- 37°34.748′N 0°49.371′W

At Monte De San Pedro, W of A Coruña, two guns :

- 43°22.649′N 8°26.359′W
- 43°22.704′N 8°26.236′W

East of Cala Llucalari, Menorca, two guns :

- 39°53.242′N 4°5.181′E
- 39°53.178′N 4°5.229′E

At Bateria de Costa, Paloma Alta, W of Algeciras, three guns:

- 36°4.497′N 5°42.978′W
- 36°4.491′N 5°42.843′W
- 36°4.467′N 5°42.702′W
