= 7.5 cm tornpjäs m/57 =

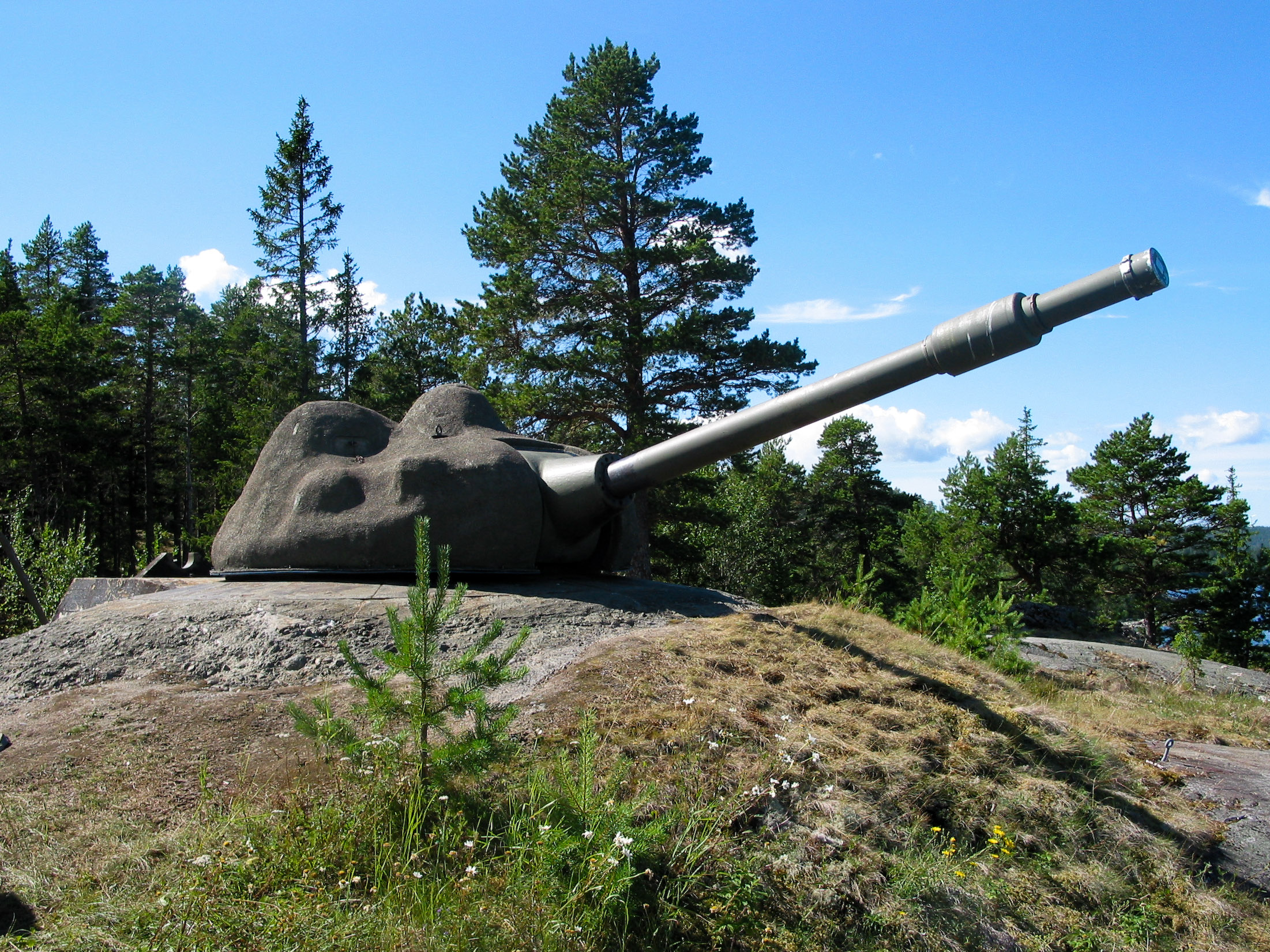
- Bofors 75 mm m/57 at Hemsö Fortress, Sweden. This gun is part of the Light Battery at Hemsö, preserved as a museum and memorial.
- Type: Coastal Artillery
- Place of origin: Sweden

Service history
- In service: 1962–2000 (Sweden); 1972–present (Norway)
- Used by: Sweden; Norway

Production history
- Designer: Bofors
- Designed: 1957
- Manufacturer: Bofors
- Produced: 1957–1975
- No. built: 90+
- Variants: 7.5/65 mobile Coastal Artillery gun

Specifications
- Barrel length: 4.245 m (13 ft 11 in) L/57
- Crew: 7
- Caliber: 75 mm (3.0 in) L/57
- Action: Semi automatic
- Breech: Vertical sliding-wedge
- Carriage: Armored fixed turret
- Elevation: −5°/+20°
- Traverse: 360°
- Rate of fire: 25 rounds/min
- Muzzle velocity: 827 m/s (2,710 ft/s)
- Maximum firing range: 12.2 km (7.6 mi)
- Feed system: 320 anti-ship rounds 280 HE rounds

The 7.5 cm tornpjäs m/57 (75 mm turret gun model 1957) was developed for the Swedish Coastal Artillery in the 1950s as a light and comparatively cheap gun that would replace a large number of mostly obsolete systems for short-range coastal defense. Eventually, 30 three-gun batteries in three distinct series were built. Sixteen guns were exported to Norway, and a mobile version of the gun called the 7.5/65 was built, making the total number of guns manufactured well over 100.

== History ==
Most of the older light coastal defenses, mainly consisting of old naval artillery, had been hastily built during World War II to meet an immediate need for short-range coastal defense but were past their useful age and had not been designed with nuclear weapons in mind. The 105 mm fully automatic gun system (105 mm tapj m/50) that was under construction at the time was plagued by manufacturer delays and other problems, so the decision was made to go for a lighter, simpler system that would be deployed for short-range defense of important points, while studying which alternative (conventional artillery, rocket artillery or missiles) would suit the need for heavier firepower.

== System description ==
=== Turret and gun system ===
The gun is mounted in an armored turret with the magazine situated at least 5 meters below ground. The turret is usually fitted with a fiberglass camouflage hood, making it hard to spot for the untrained eye. Another distinct feature is the fork which the barrel rests in when the gun is not active. This was done to reduce ground shockwave effects from nuclear weapons. When not used the barrel is fitted with a fiberglass cover for camouflage.

7,5/57 is an air-cooled semi-automatic gun with a vertically sliding breech block and a monoblock barrel fitted with a fume extractor. It uses fixed ammunition which is fed from a magazine below the gun by means of an elevator. Loading of the elevator as well as the gun is by hand, but the elevator bottom features a revolving drum which acts as a buffer. Spent cartridges are ejected into a pipe arrangement and slide downwards to a room opposite to the magazine. Normally, each gun is served by 7 men with 3 in the turret itself (gun captain, traverse operator and elevation operator) and 4 ammunition handlers in the magazine. Additional crew is needed for the ranging stations, command center, galley and for close-in protection.

The gun had a rate of fire of 25 rounds per minute and could fire a 5.52 kilograms (12.2 lb) High Explosive shell to a range of 12,000 metres (7.5 mi). Alternative rounds included an armour-piercing anti-ship shell, with a range of 11,400 metres (7.1 mi) and a High Capacity Extended Range shell, with a range of 16,000 metres (9.9 mi).

=== Series 1 ===
The first 8 batteries were built with a central installation featuring fire control, power supply and accommodation, and with tunnels leading to each gun. Adaptions were made and some installations did not feature tunnels to each unit, but the dependence on the central unit is a common denominator. Sometimes, parts of the battery were brilliantly camouflaged, for example, Battery OD (which is now the Femörefortet museum) had its entrance cleverly disguised as a small house with a garage in its bottom floor, the garage being the entrance to the installation. The construction technology used involved blasting a central tunnel in which a concrete building was erected. Smaller tunnels usually connected each individual unit with some exceptions due to terrain restrictions.

=== Series 2 ===
The second series, consisting of 10 batteries, was a step towards increasing survivability by reducing each unit's dependence on the central facility and by increasing the distance between each unit. This was not perfect however, for example the guns still depended on power from the main unit. The construction technology employed was mostly the same as for Series 1, except that large shafts were blasted in which the concrete structures were placed. This was then covered with a concrete "lid".

=== Series 3 ===
Series 3 (12 batteries) was a major upgrade to the 7.5/57 system. Here, a lot more emphasis was placed on nuclear survivability and the individual units were further spread out. Each unit was also made completely self-sufficient and the accommodations were improved to increase comfort. To improve protection against ground shockwaves, the older concrete structures which had been rigidly built inside the tunnels were replaced with steel framed structures which were placed on elastic dampers thus decoupling them from the surrounding rock. EMP protection was also installed. While the Series 1 and 2 had a mechanical fire control system, Series 3 received a much more modern analog electronic system. Since each unit was standardized training did not necessarily have to take place at the same battery as the recruits' wartime assignments. This standardization also helped reduce costs.

=== Common characteristics ===
Auxiliary power was provided by 2 Scania diesel generators, with enough fuel for 60 days of operation. Water was supplied by a saltwater intake (for toilets, showers etc.) and a drilled well for fresh water.
Each battery had a number of dummy turrets which basically consisted of the fiberglass hood, a steel pipe and a heat source which was placed inside the dummy turret to give it an IR signature. Dummy rangefinders and targeting radars was also built. A number of shelters (type SK10) and prepared foxholes were provided for the close-in defense troops.

=== Fire Control, Series 1 and 2 ===
The first fire control system developed for 7.5/57 was Ci 710 (Central Instrument 710). This consisted of a mechanical ballistics computer, a periscope and a radar installed in the battery command post. An additional search periscope and radar PPI was provided as well as an optical rangefinder in the reserve command post. This was replaced with the world's first operative military laser rangefinder, an Ericsson design called AML 701, starting in 1968. The Ci 710 computer was built by Arenco and would take its input from either the radar, periscope or laser rangefinder and produce parallax corrected firing parameters for the three guns. The gun crew was provided with analog displays which would show traverse and elevation which they then had to manually follow.

=== Fire Control, Series 3 ===
For the new Series 3 batteries a new fire control system called ArtE 719 was developed by Philips Elektronikindustrier AB (PEAB). This eliminated the periscopes, replacing them with a remote controlled low-light TV system with an integrated laser rangefinder thus enabling the command post to be located away from the ranging station. Also, the radar was completely replaced with a more modern unit. It featured an analog electronic calculation unit which could track 2 targets simultaneously, as well as digital transmission of normalized target parameters to a computer at each gun emplacement where its individual firing parameters would be calculated. The gun crew, however, still had to lay their gun manually as automatic control was not included. The two target trackers allowed for engaging two targets simultaneously, with the guns firing a number of salvos on target 1 and then shifting to target 2 and firing on it while the shells to target 1 were in the air, after which the cycle was repeated as necessary. Short-term rate of fire was about one shell every other second.

== Battery locations ==
=== Series 1 ===
No.	Designator	Name	Location	Completed
1	LN	Ljugarn	Sjausterhammar, Gotland	1962
2	DL2/HÖ2/HU	Hemsö	Havstoudd, Hemsö	1964
3	OD	Oxelösund	Femöre battery	1964
4	HO3	Holmsund	Bredskär	1964
5	KM2	Karlshamn	Sternö, Blekinge	1964
6	SI	Simrishamn	Gladsax, Skåne	1964
7	MB	Mörtö-Bunsö	Island near Dalarö	1965
8	KN	Kolgårdsholmen	Kolguskär, near Landsort	1966

=== Series 2 ===
No.	Designator	Name	Location	Completed
9	RU	Råstensudde	Northern Singö	1967
10	AD	Arkösund	Bergön, Bråviken	1967
11	MÖ	Malmö	Lernacken	1967
12	YD2	Ystad	Svarte	1967
13	GÖ	Galterö	Island near Gothenburg	1968
14	SE2	Slite	St Olofsholm, Gotland	1968
15	SL4	Sundsvall	Nyhamn	1968
16	LÅ	Långskär	Söderarm	1969
17	LK	Lysekil	St Kornö	1970
18	VG2/HÖ3	Hemsö	Härnön near Härnösand	1970

=== Series 3 ===
No.	Designator	Name	Location	Completed
19	GI	Gisslingö	Söderarm	1971
20	FÅ	Fårö	Ryssnäs	1971
21	JV	Järnavik	Tärnö-Harö, Blekinge	1971
22	KP	Kappelshamn	Kappelshamn Bay, Gotland	1972
23	EN	Ellenabben	Aspö, Blekinge	1972
24	RN4	Roten	Southern Singö, Uppland	1972
25	TE2	Trelleborg	Maglarp	1973
26	SA2	Söderarm	Båtskär, Uppland	1973
27	MS4/YG	Mellsten	Yttre Gården, Nynäshamn	1973
28	BÅ	Bråviken	Kungshamn, Nyköping	1974
29	MD	Marstrand	Koön	1975
30	KO2	Korsö	Vindalsö	1975

=== Norwegian forts ===
No.	Name	Location	Completed	Number of guns
1	Bolærne	Oslofjord	1972/1974	3
2	Visterøy/Buarøy	Korsfjord, outside Bergen	1972	2
3	Breiviknes	Ullsfjord	1976	3
4	Årøybukt	Lyngenfjord	1977	3
5	Rauøy	Oslofjord	1979	3
6	Skjeljanger	Hjeltefjord, outside Bergen	1983	2

== Proposals, trials and final disposal ==
=== 7.5/57-95 ===
In the 1990s, the 7.5/57 system was nearing the time for its MLU. To try out new features, Battery RU was selected as a trials unit and extensively modified. Modifications included:

- Improved camouflage, signature reduction
- Protection from laser guided munitions using a water fog system
- Fire control replaced with ArtE 727
- Improved ventilation system

This was evaluated in the late 1990s when the Swedish government decided to disband most of the coastal artillery and focus on amphibious units caused all work on the MLU to be aborted.

=== Scrapping ===
In the late 1990s, the Swedish Armed Forces decided that some 7.5/57 units were to be disbanded. This was eventually extended to all 7.5/57 units and scrapping of those units not slated to become memorials started immediately. In the case of Battery OD a private group managed to save it from scrapping and it is now a museum.
Scrapping involves removing the gun turrets, all equipment and environmental hazards. After this every opening is sealed with concrete, the area around the battery cleaned up and in most cases any bans on trespassing, photography etc. are lifted unless the military plans to use the area for other purposes.

=== Surviving examples ===
Sweden

- Series 1 Battery HU (Hemsö fortress) is a State Construction Memorial and owned by Statens Fastighetsverk.
- Series 3 Battery EN3 (Ellenabben/Aspö) is also a State Construction Memorial and owned by Statens Fastighetsverk. Only one turret of the battery has been preserved.
- Series 1 Battery OD (Femöre Fortress) is owned by a museum association. It has been partially dismantled below ground to save on maintenance costs.
- Various individual guns and other bits and pieces have been placed at museums like Beredskapsmuseet, Skåne and at Fårösund, Gotland.

Norway

- Series 3 Battery Bolærne is preserved, including radar and two rangefinder turrets.
- Armoured part of the turret with the gun of Skjeljanger battery is placed at the Tellevik battery (Atlantic wall museum).
- Another Norway turrets were scrapped at considerable costs. Scrapping was started at 2009
