= Gmina Jastarnia =

- Urban and rural municipality
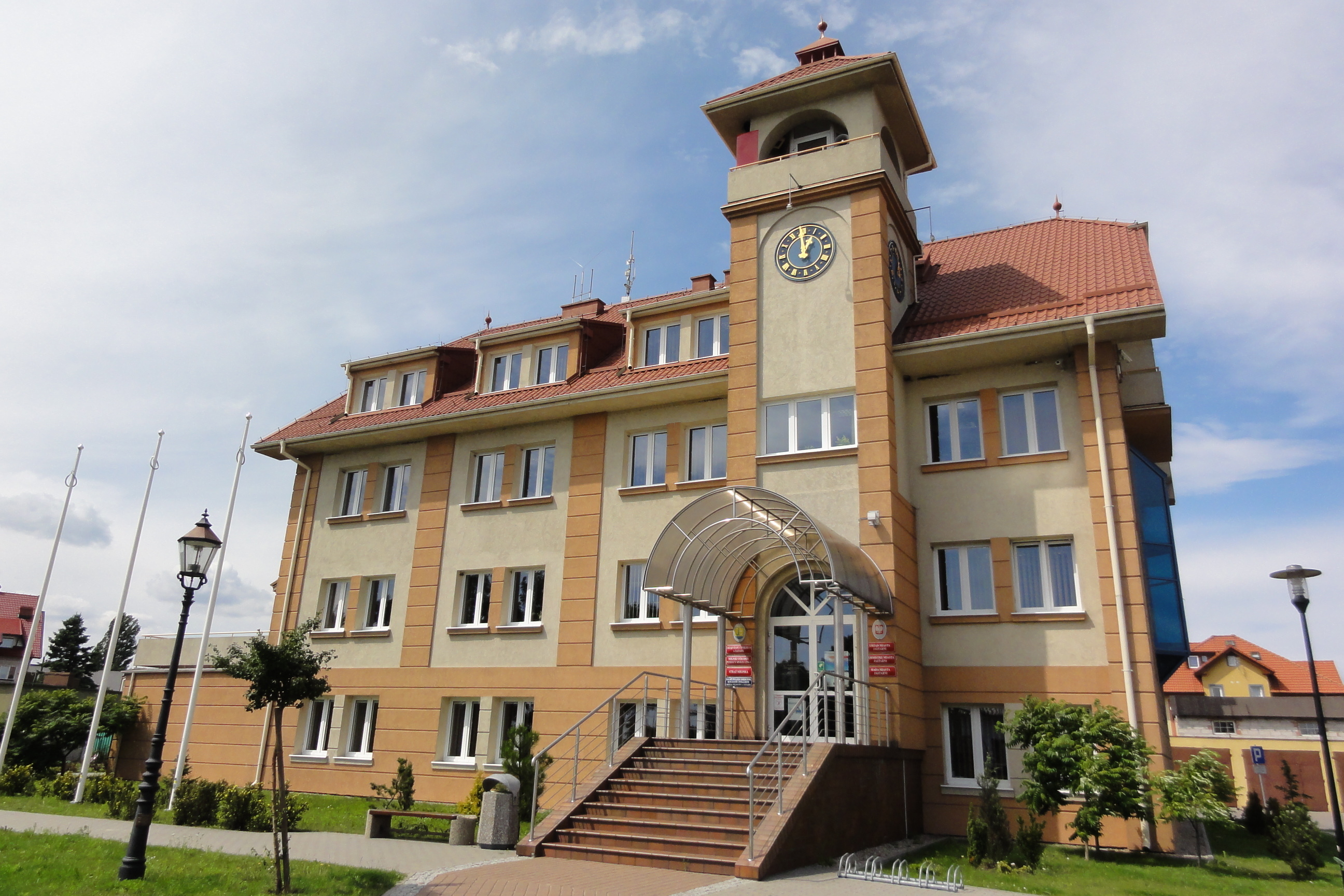
- Jastarnia Town Hall

- Flag Coat of arms

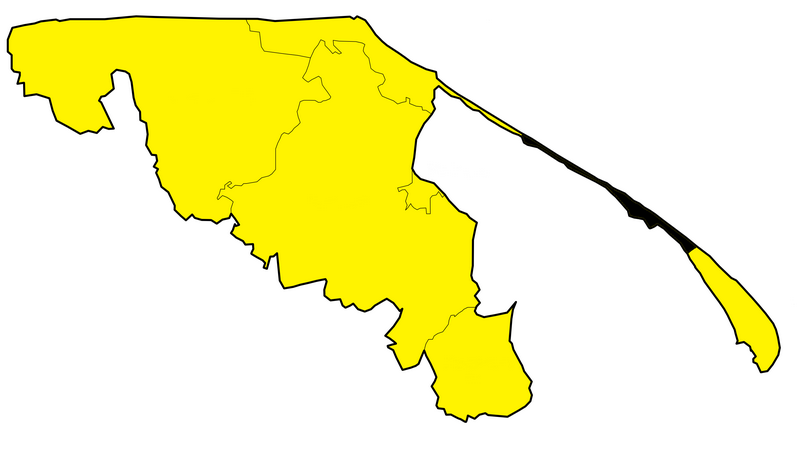
- Location within Puck County
- Coordinates: 54°42′21″N 18°39′15″E
- Country: Poland
- Voivodeship: Pomeranian
- County: Puck
- Established: 1 January 2017
- Seat: Jastarnia

Area
  - Total: 7.8 km^{2} (3.0 sq mi)

Population (2021)
  - Total: 3,554
  - Density: 460/km^{2} (1,200/sq mi)
- Car plates: GPU

Gmina Jastarnia (Polish: [jaˈstar.ɲa]) is an urban and rural municipality in Pomeranian Voivodeship, Poland, within Puck County, located on the Hel Peninsula. Its seat of government is in the town of Jastarnia. It has an area of 7.8 km^{2}, and in 2021, it had a population of 3,554 people.

== History ==
On 1 January 1973, the urban-type settlement of Jastarnia received a status of the town, becoming an urban municipality. On 1 January 2017, it was changed to an urban and rural municipality, after villages of Kuźnica and Jurata were separated from the town.

== Administration ==
The seat of its government is located in the town of Jastarnia. It also includes villages of Kuźnica and Jurata. With the area of 7.8 km^{2}, it is the smallest urban and rular municipality in the country. It is governed by the municipal council with 15 members.

== Demography ==
In 2021, the municipality was inhabited by 3,554 people, which was 3.96% of the population of the county. 54.7% of its population were Kashubian, and 23.6% spoke Kashubian language. In 2002, it had the largest percentage population of Kashubians out of all municipalities in Poland.
