= Kuźnica, Pomeranian Voivodeship =

Kuźnica
- Village
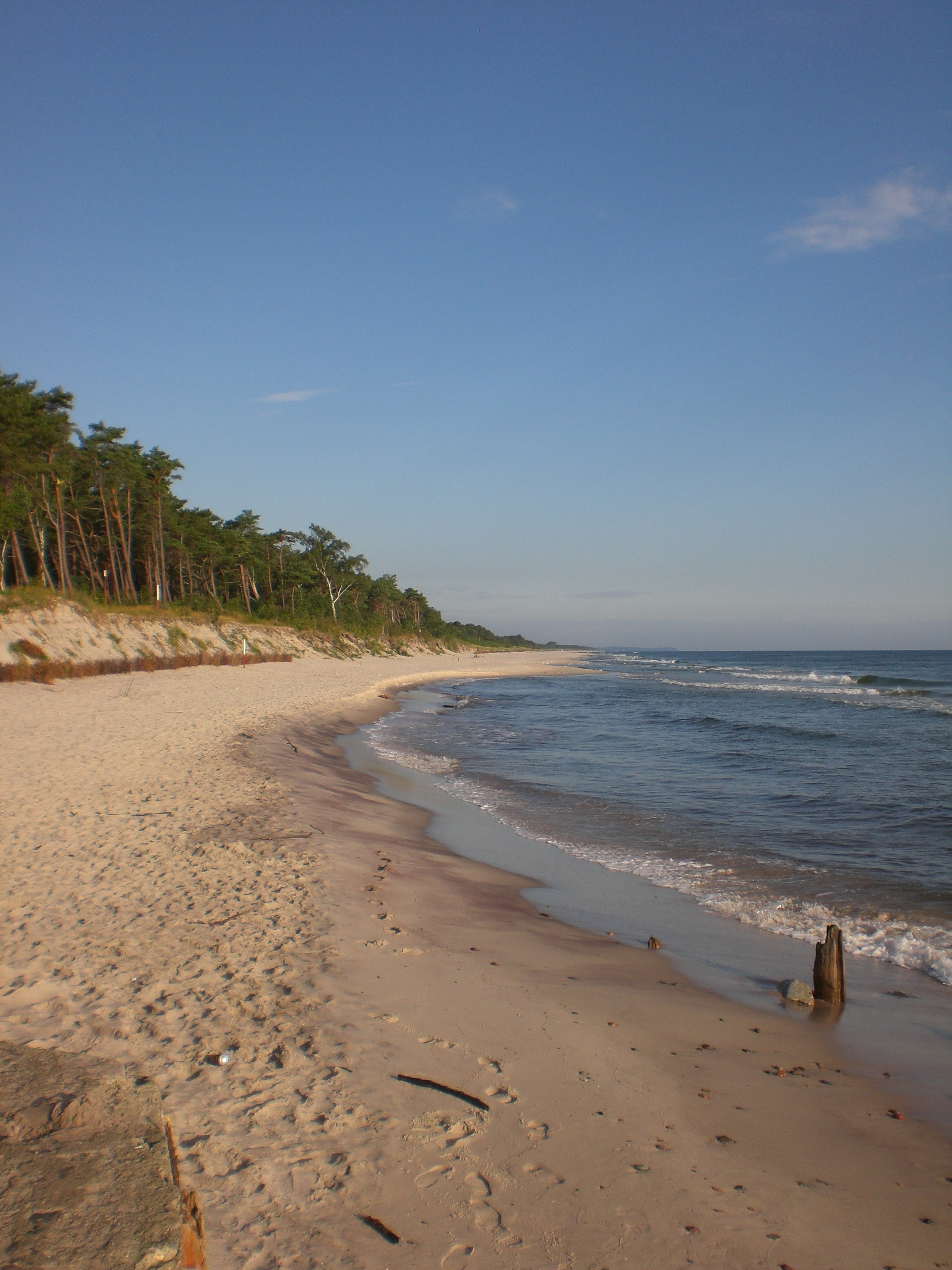
- Beach in Kuźnica

- Location within Poland Location within Pomeranian Voivodeship
- Coordinates: 54°44′N 18°34′E
- Country: Poland
- Voivodeship: Pomeranian
- County: Puck
- Gmina: Jastarnia
- First mentioned: 1570
- Time zone: UTC+1 (CET)
  - Summer (DST): UTC+2 (CEST)
- Vehicle registration: GPU

Kuźnica is a settlement and popular seaside resort in northern Poland, located between Chałupy and Jastarnia on the Hel Peninsula on the southern coast of the Baltic Sea in Puck County, Pomeranian Voivodeship.

== History ==
The village was first mentioned in 1570. Kuźnica was a royal village of the Polish Crown, administratively located in the Puck County in the Pomeranian Voivodeship. In 1635, in the face of a Polish–Swedish War, Polish King Władysław IV Vasa ordered the construction of the Kazimierzowo sea fort. During the Swedish invasion of Poland (Deluge) in 1655 the Poles withdrew to Puck, and Kazimierzowo was taken over by the Swedes. After the war Kuźnica developed as a fishing village.

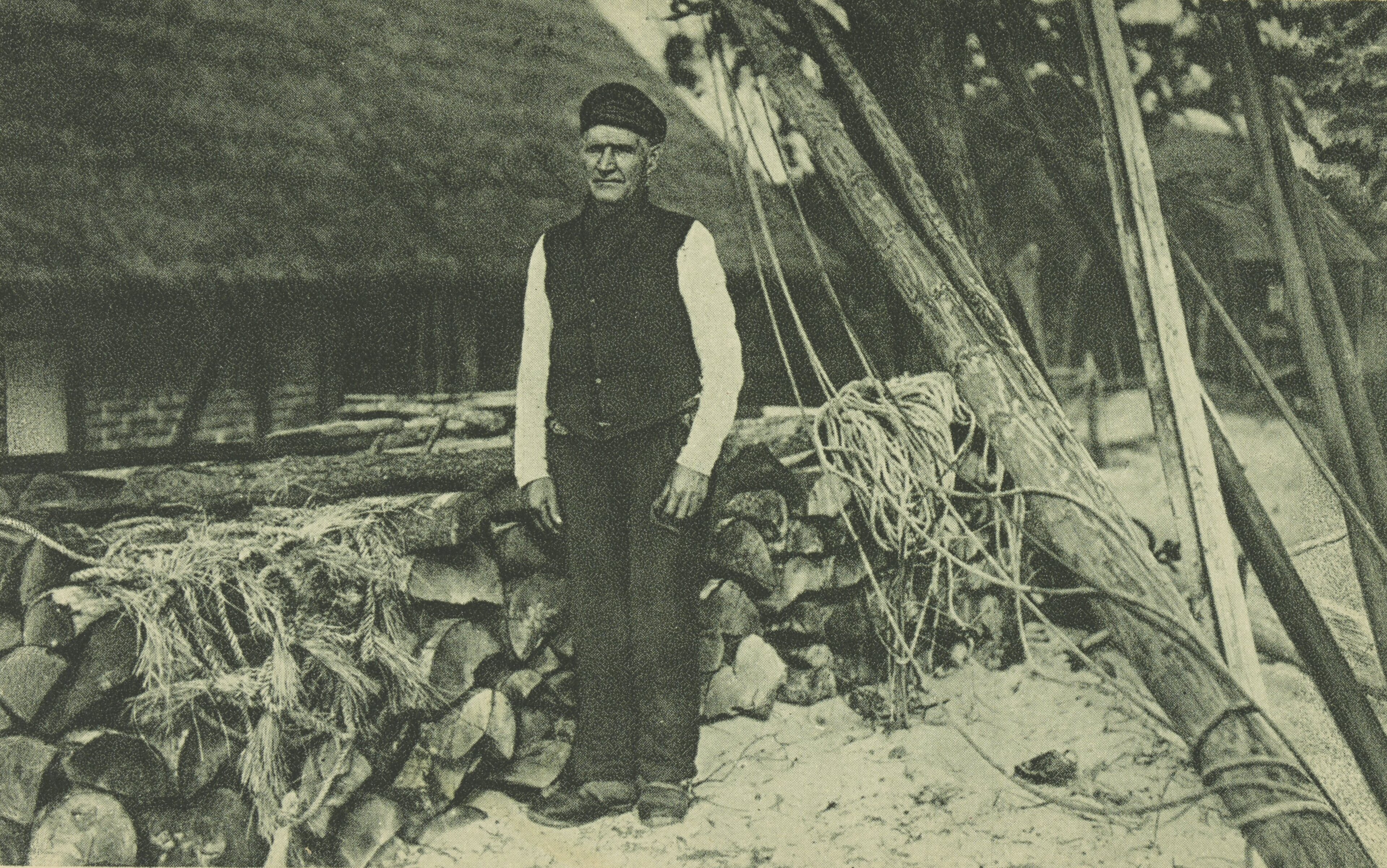
Fisherman, before 1939

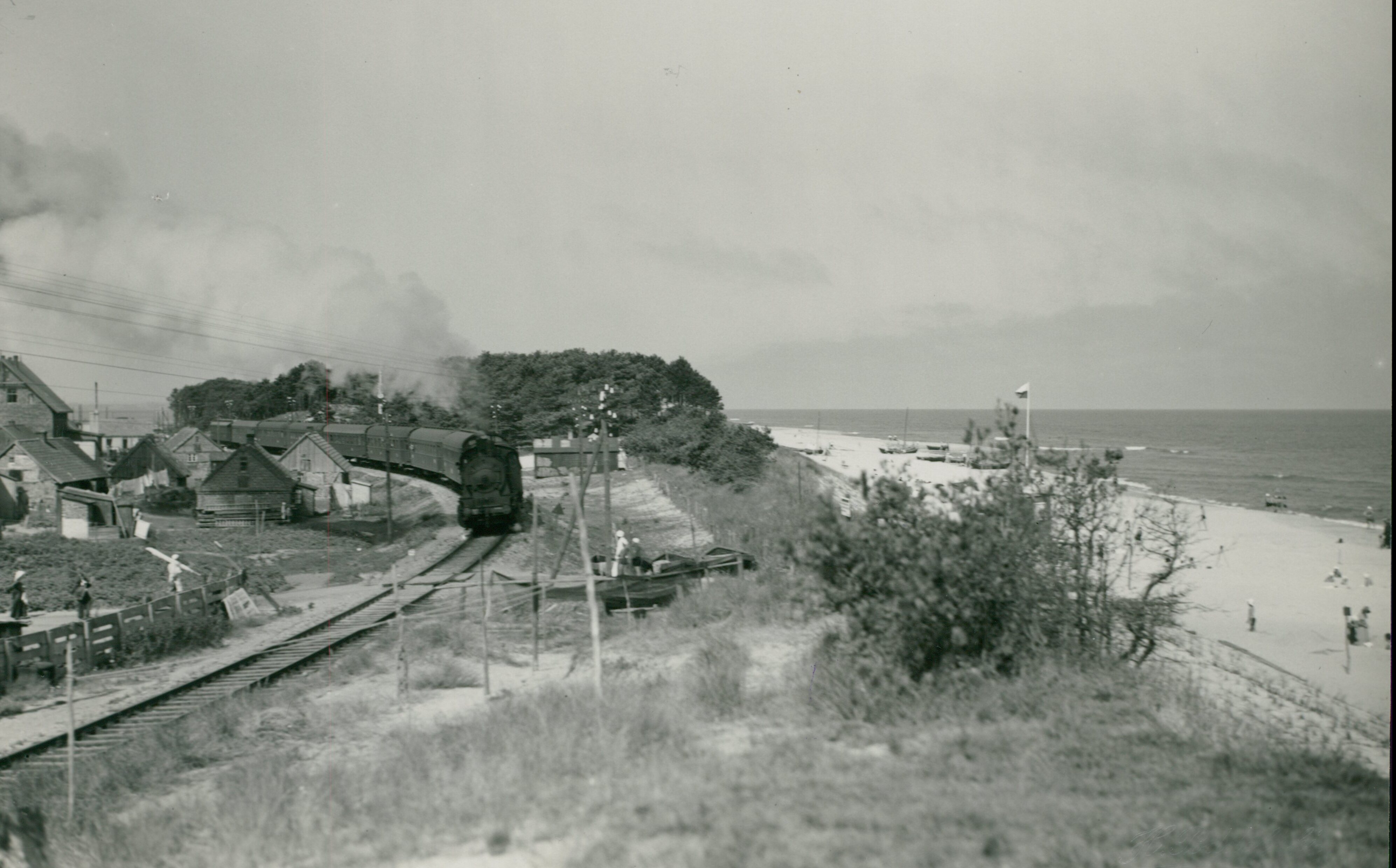
Train in Hel, Kuźnica, before 1939

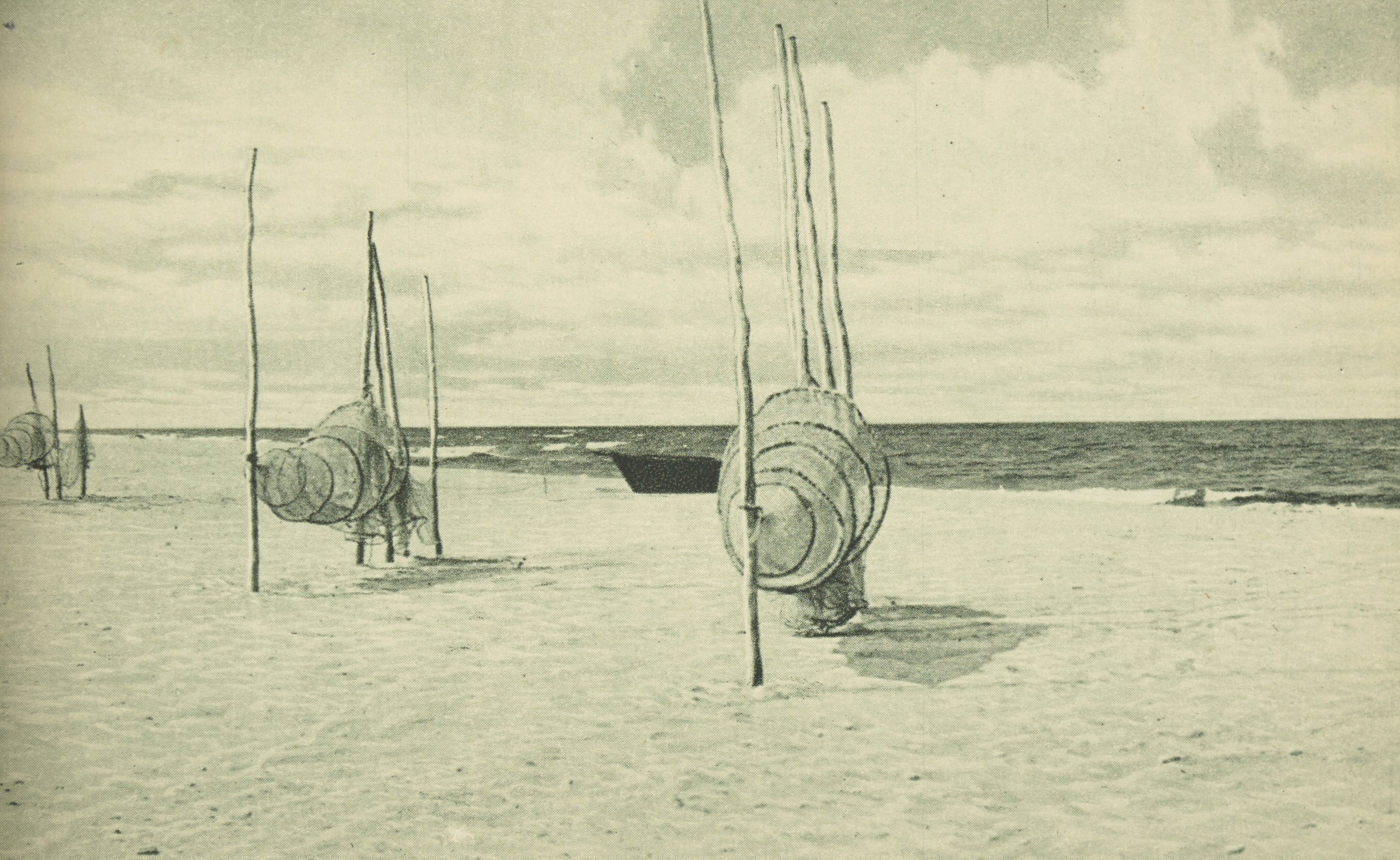
Fishing nets, 1905–1944

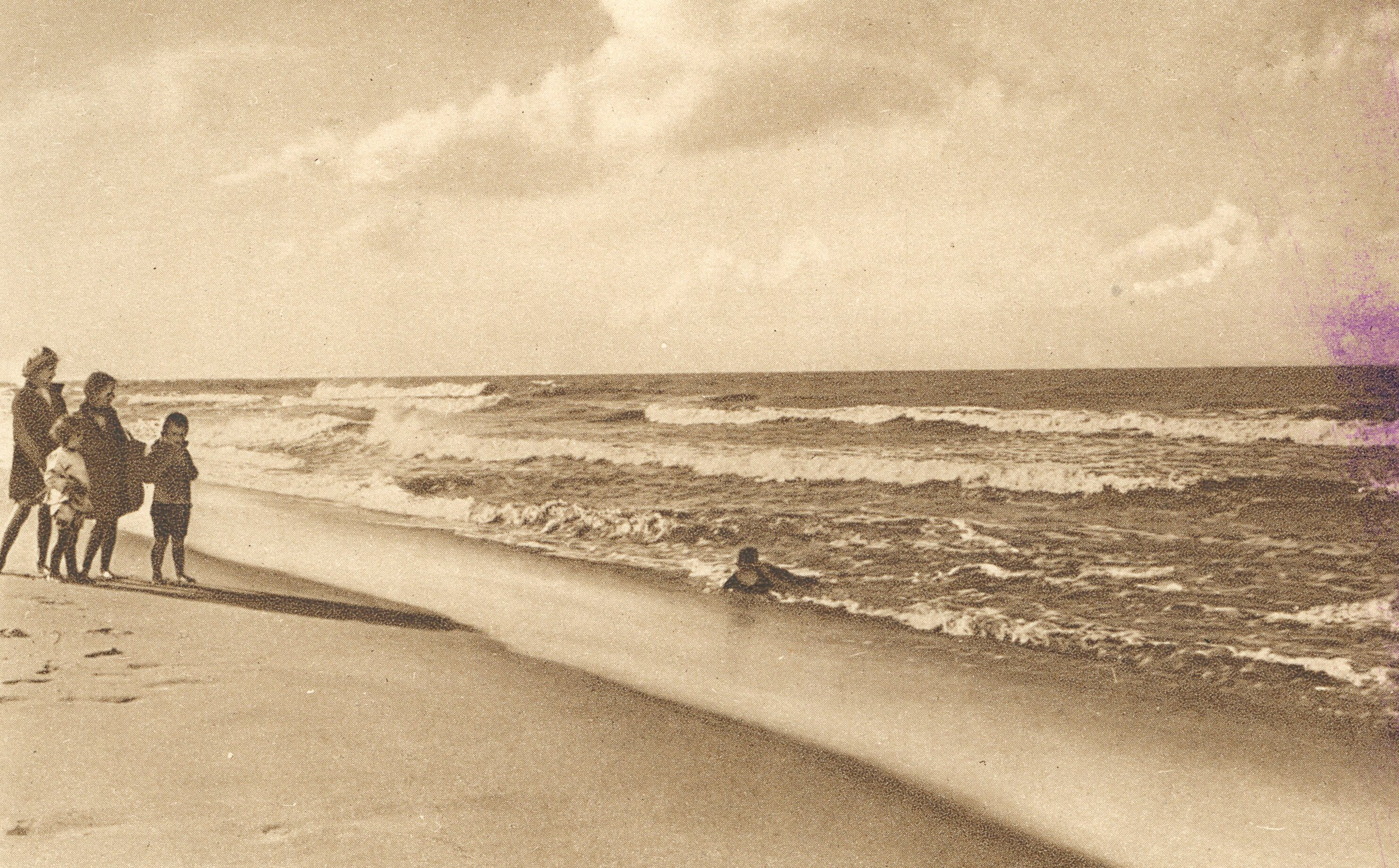
The sea between Kuźnica and Chałupy, before 1935

During the German occupation of Poland (World War II), several Poles from Hel were enslaved as forced labour to serve new German colonists in Kuźnica.

== Gallery ==
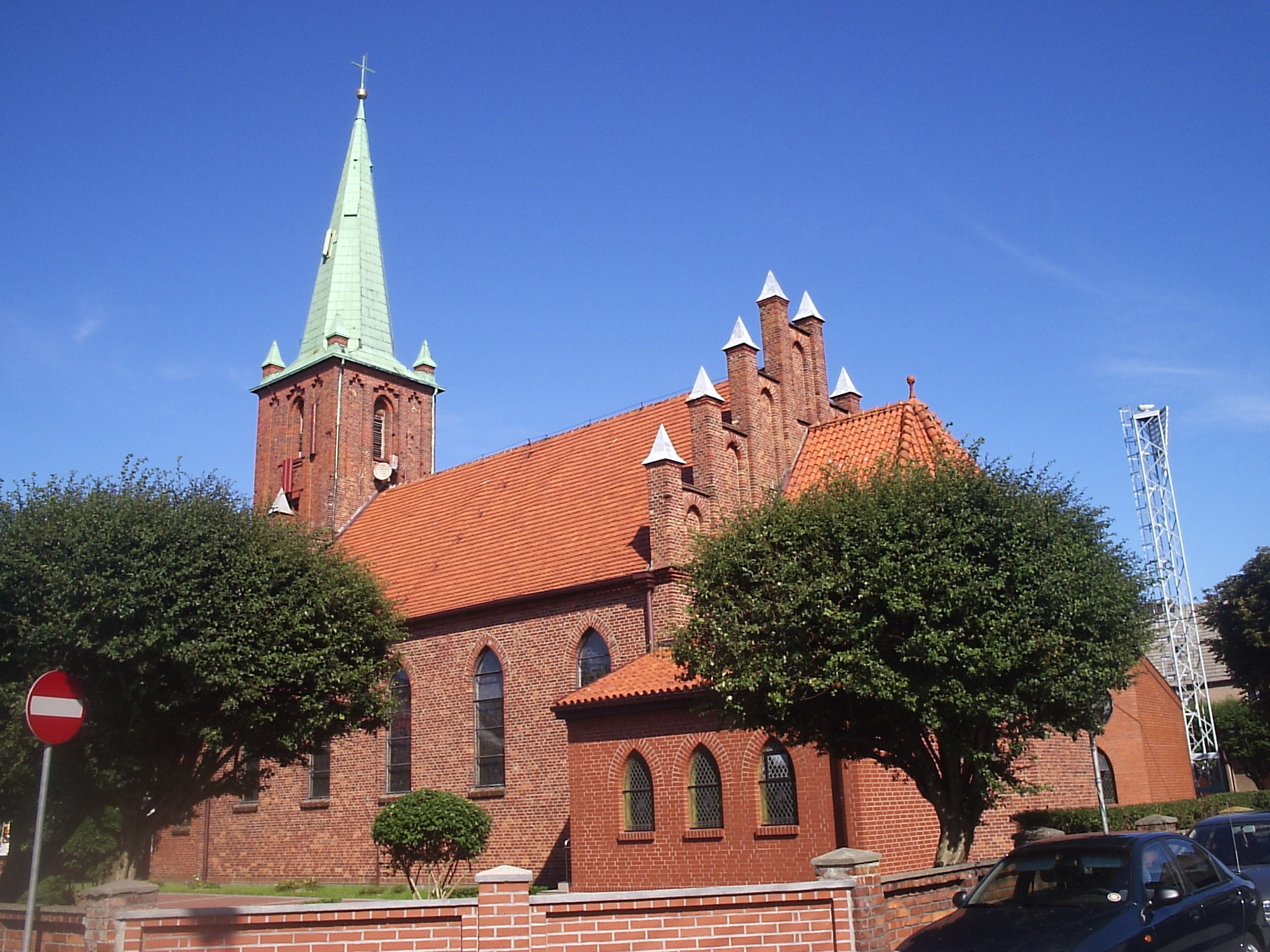
Saint Anthony church

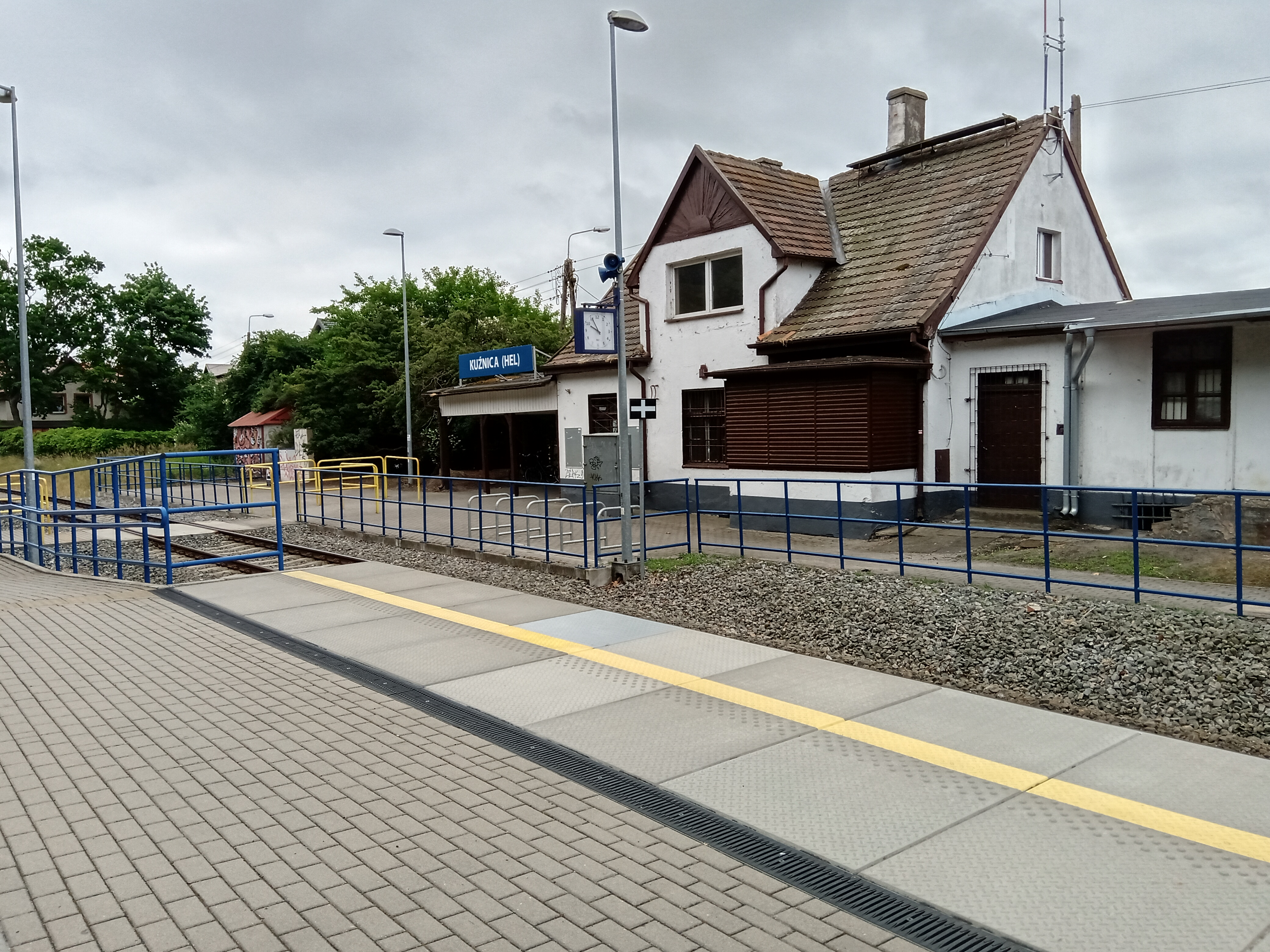
Train station

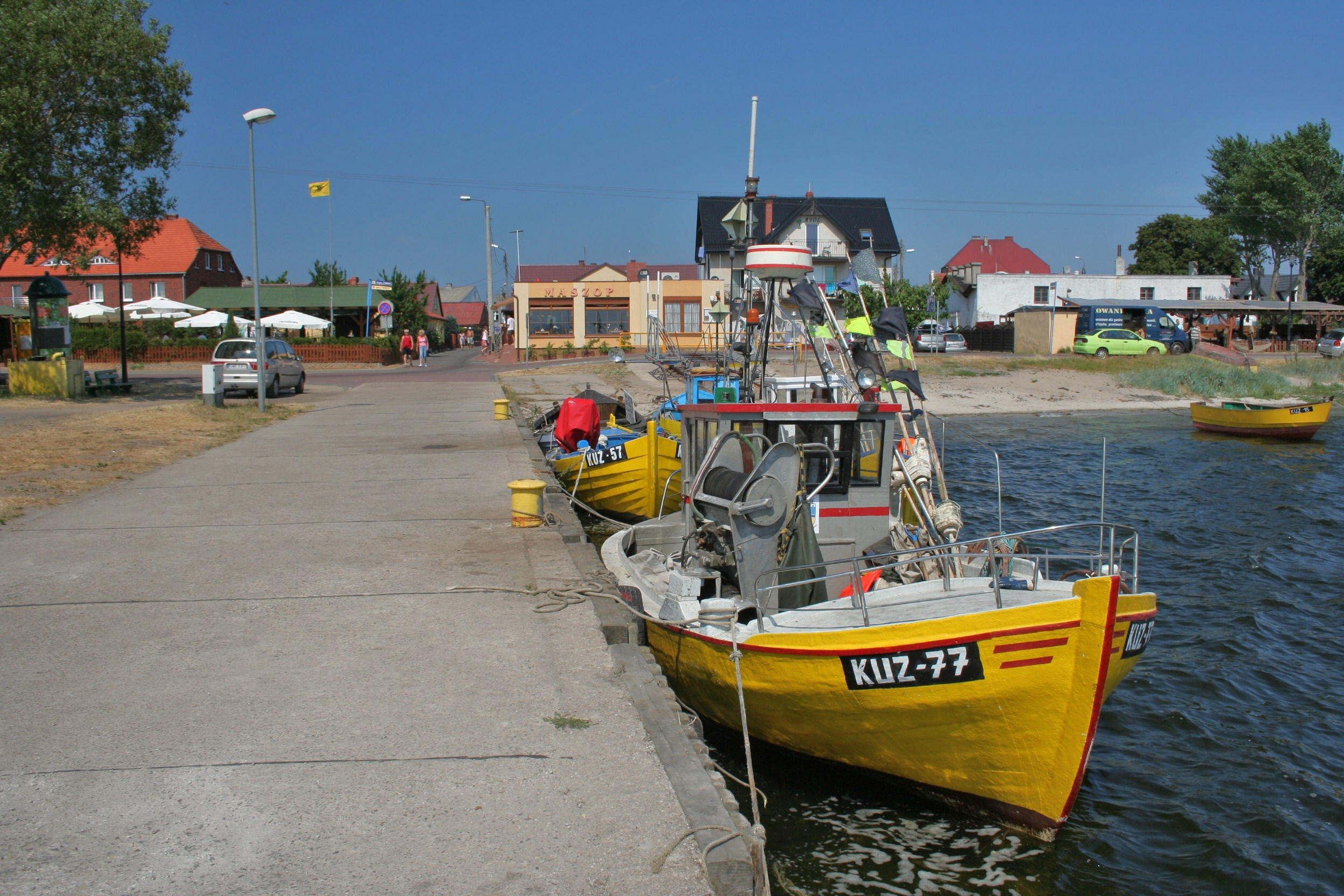
Kuźnica Harbour

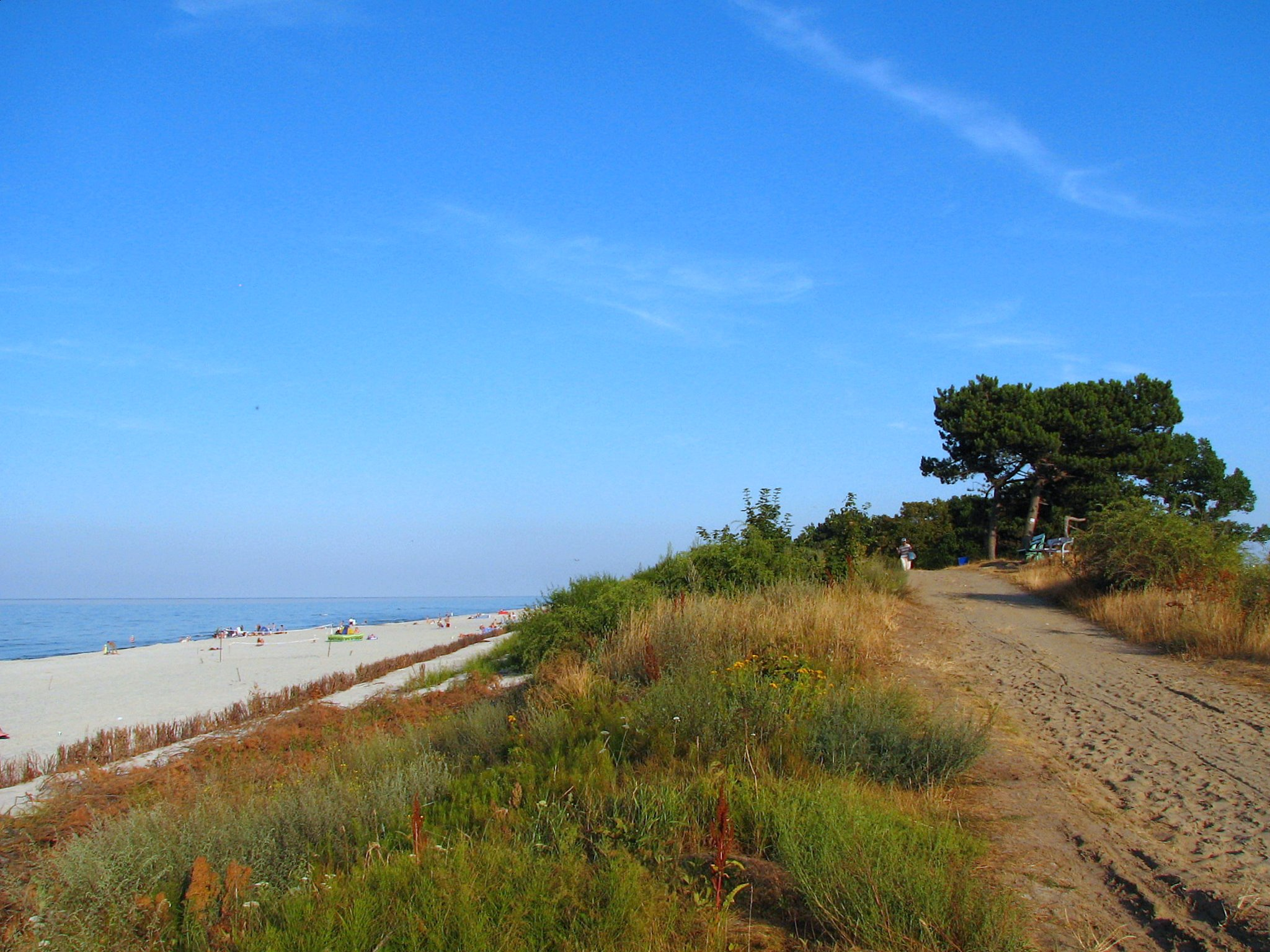
Beach

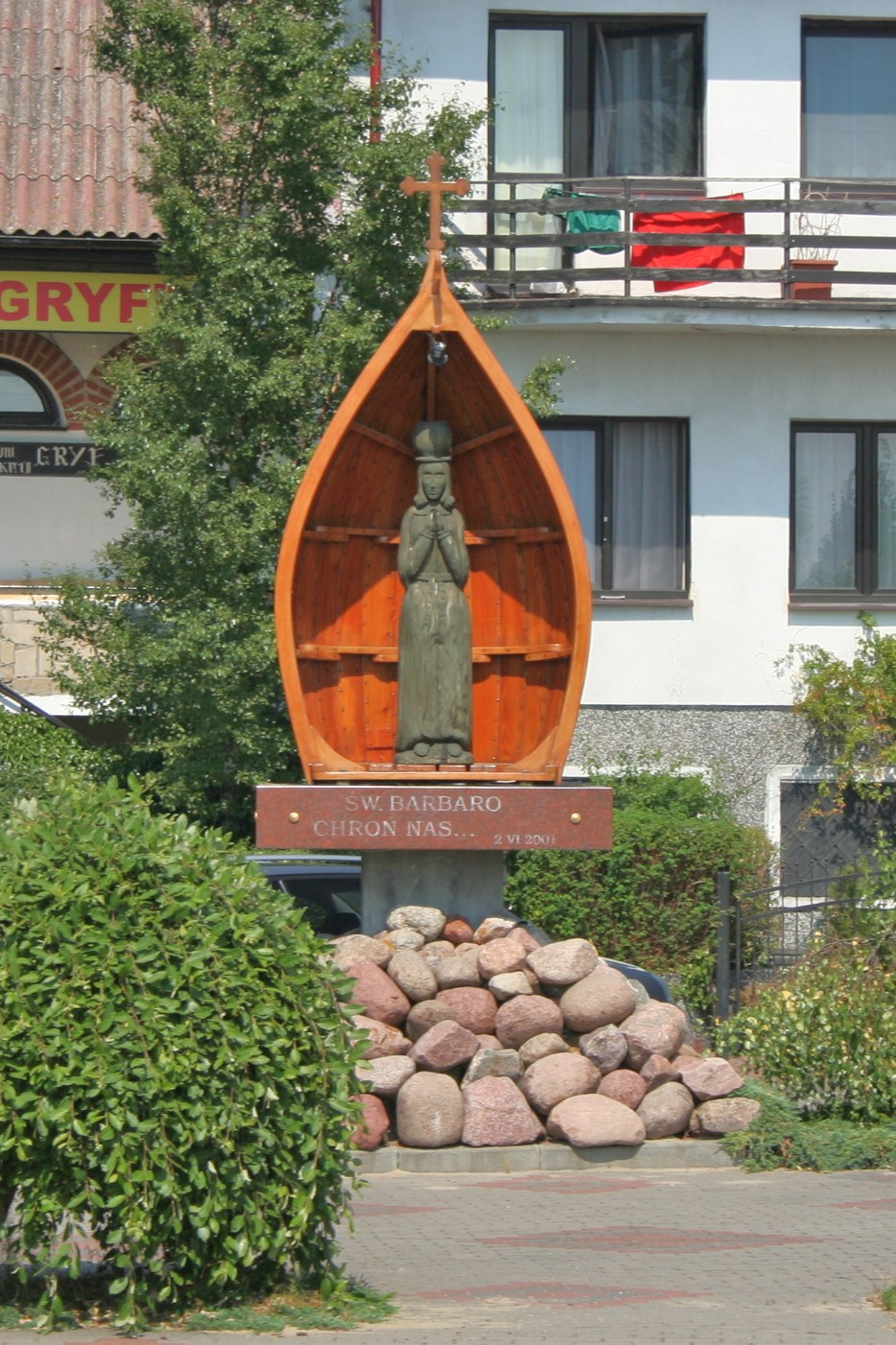
Wayside shrine

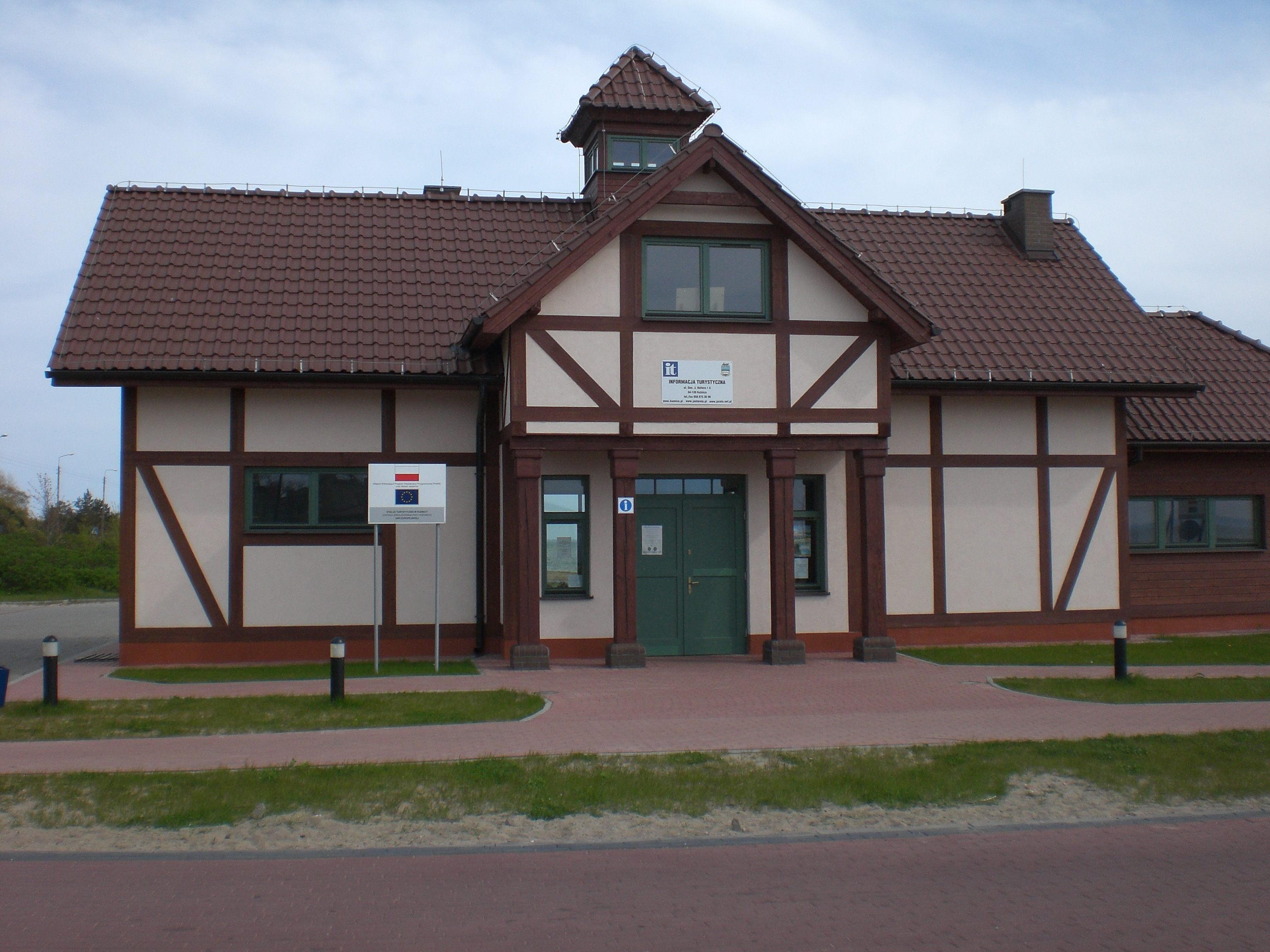
Tourist information centre

== See also ==
- Jurata
- Bay of Puck
