= Jastarnia =

Resort town in northern Poland

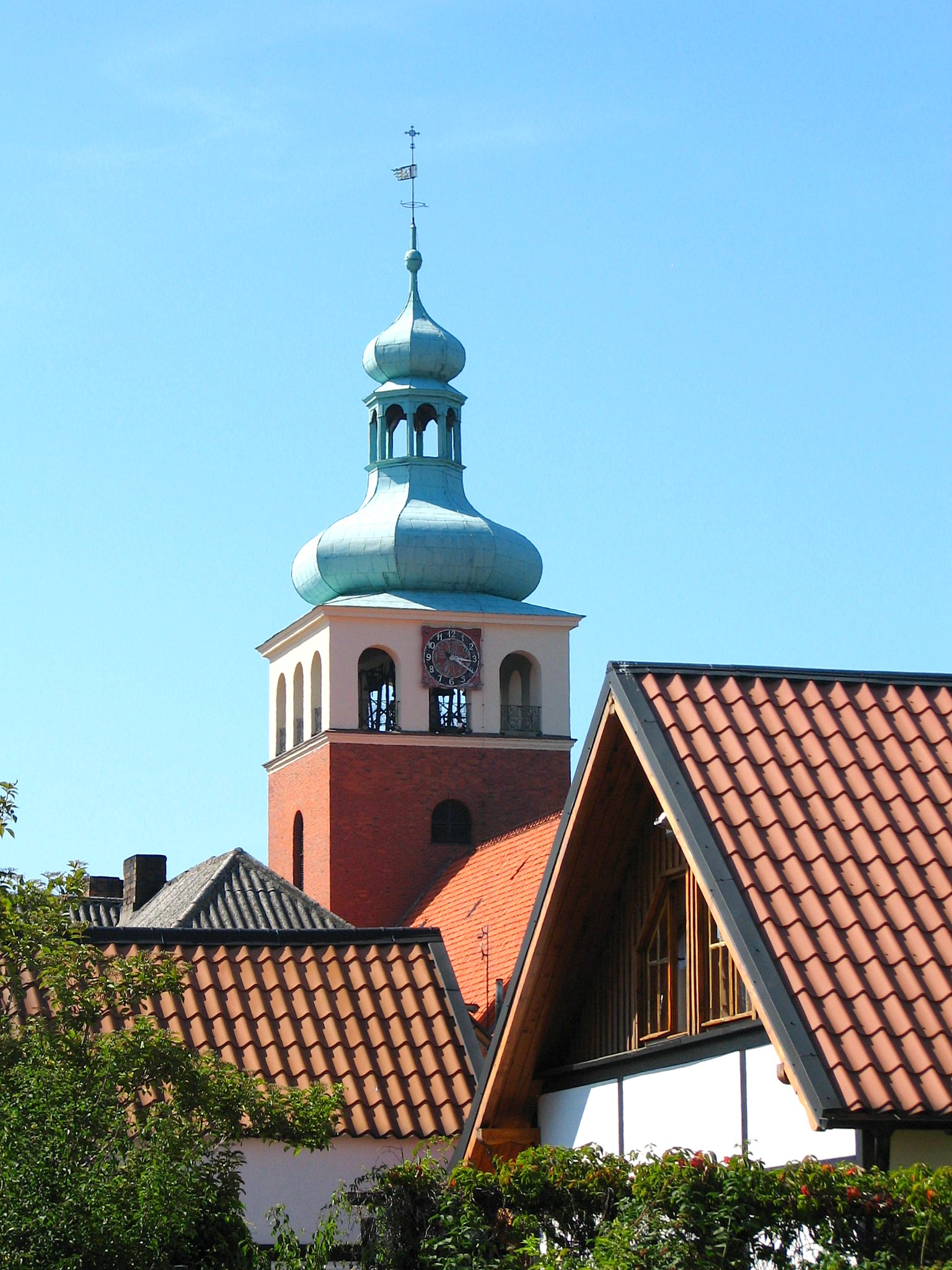
- Church of the Visitation in Jastarnia

- Flag Coat of arms

- Location within Poland
- Coordinates: 54°42′05″N 18°40′17″E
- Country: Poland
- Voivodeship: Pomeranian
- County: Puck
- Gmina: Jastarnia (urban gmina)
- Established: 1379
- Town rights: 1973

Government
  - Mayor: Tyberiusz Zygmunt Narkowicz

Area
  - Total: 8 km^{2} (3.1 sq mi)
- Elevation: 7 m (23 ft)

Population (2023)
  - Total: 2,608
  - Density: 330/km^{2} (840/sq mi)
- Time zone: UTC+1 (CET)
  - Summer (DST): UTC+2 (CEST)
- Postal code: 84-140
- Area code: +48 58
- Car plates: GPU
- Website: http://www.jastarnia.pl

Jastarnia [jaˈstarɲa] (Kashubian: Jastarniô, German: Heisternest) is a resort town in Puck County, Pomeranian Voivodship, northern Poland. It is located on the Hel Peninsula on the Baltic Sea. It is a popular Polish seaside resort and small fishing port.

The municipal commune of Jastarnia consists of three districts: Jastarnia, Kuźnica, Jurata.

== History ==
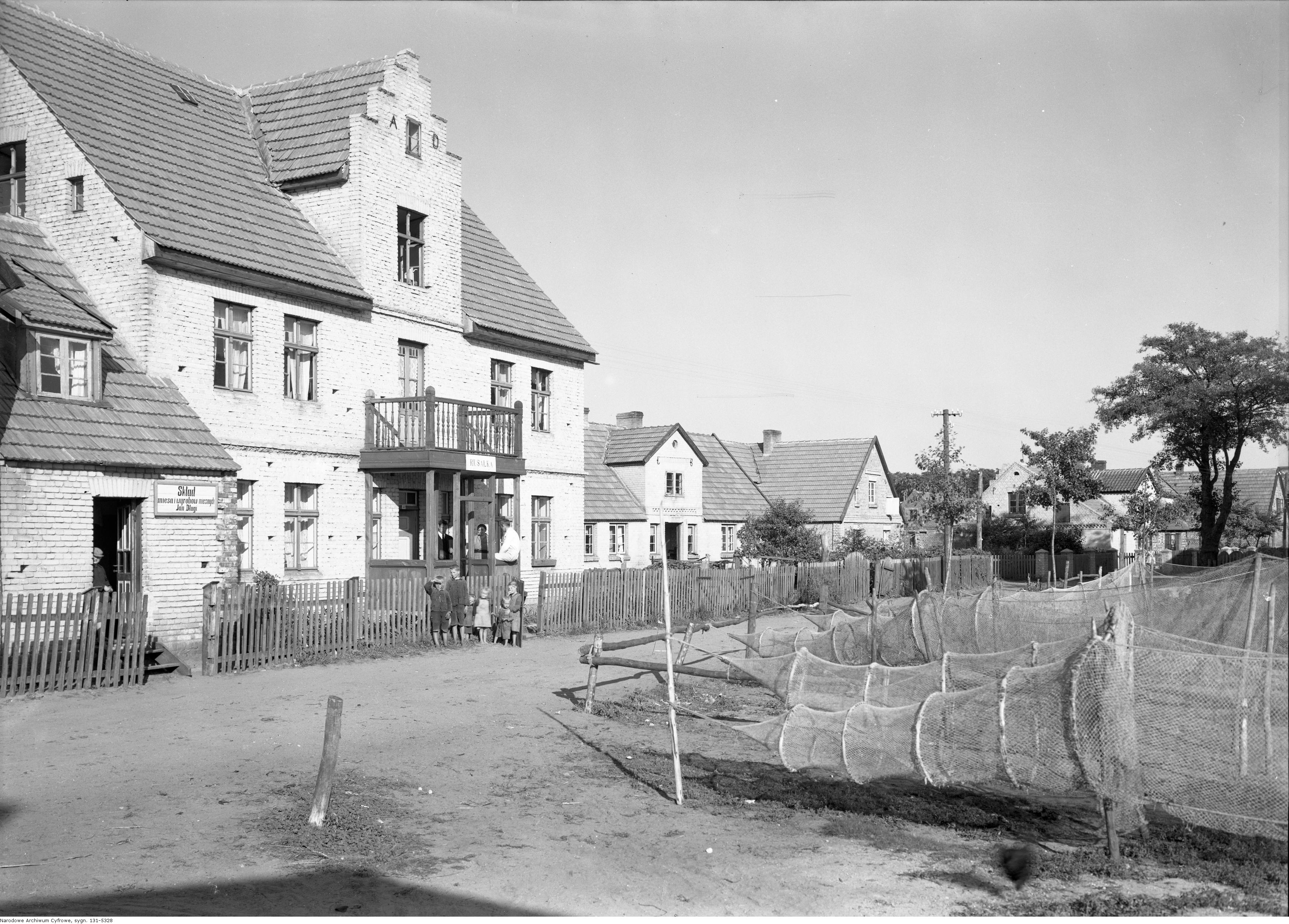
Jastarnia in 1933

The population of Jastarnia for centuries was Polish and Catholic, however, the first church was founded only before 1750 by Urszula Przebendowska. The place was mentioned as "Osternese" in 1582, which is derived from North Germanic.

Following the late-18th-century Partitions of Poland, the settlement was annexed by Prussia. The Prussian government attempted to Germanize the population through schools and the church. German church services were introduced, but they were ineffective. In the 1860s, German sermons were limited to three per year. Hieronim Gołębiewski, parish priest since 1872, abolished German sermons and singing. Following World War I, Poland regained independence and control of Jastarnia.

During World War II, Jastarnia was occupied by Germany from 1939 to 1945.

== International relations ==
Jastarnia is twinned with:

Baabe, Germany; Elbe-Parey, Germany	Wisła, Poland; Wałbrzych, Poland

== Gallery ==
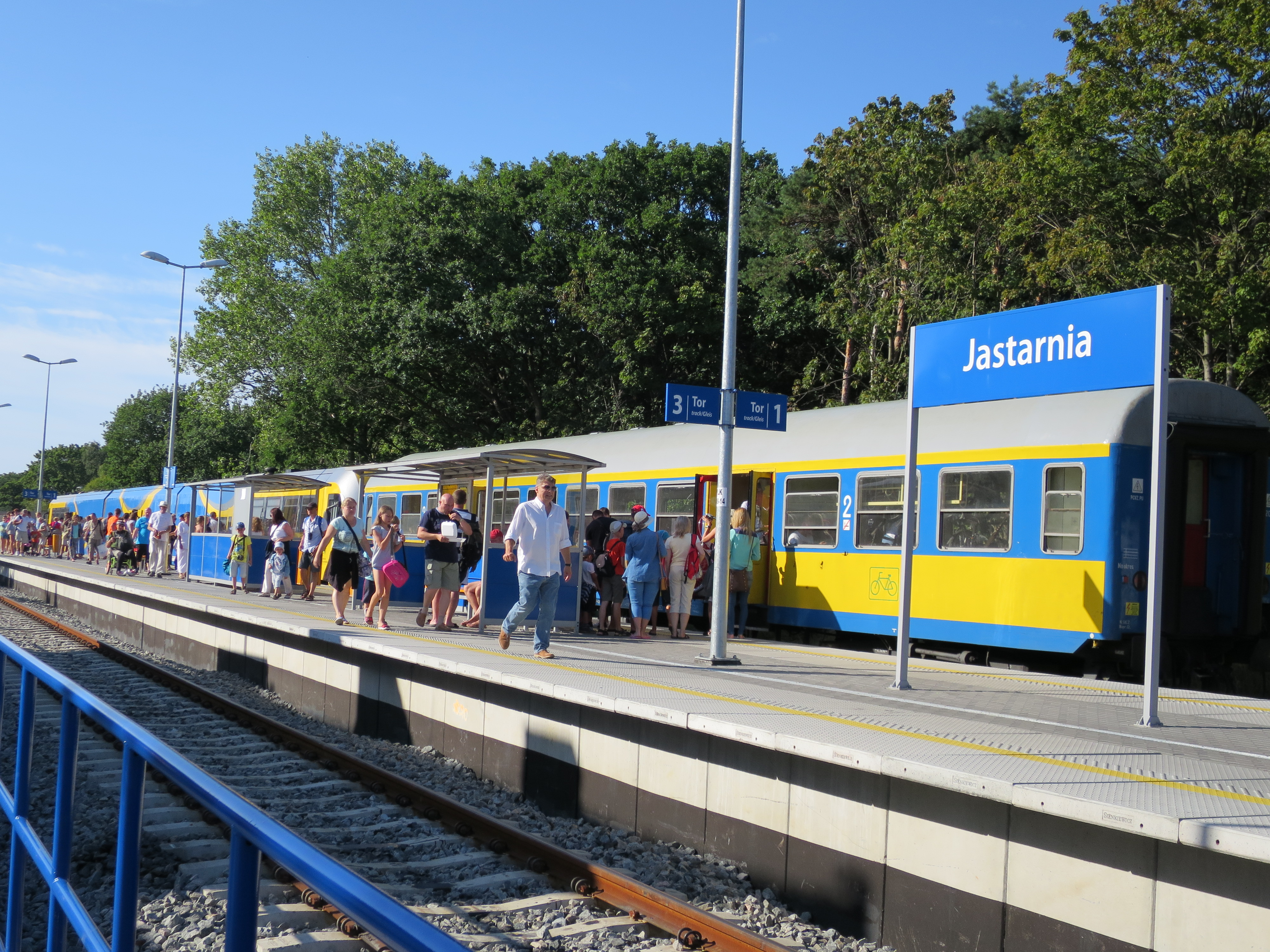
Jastarnia train station

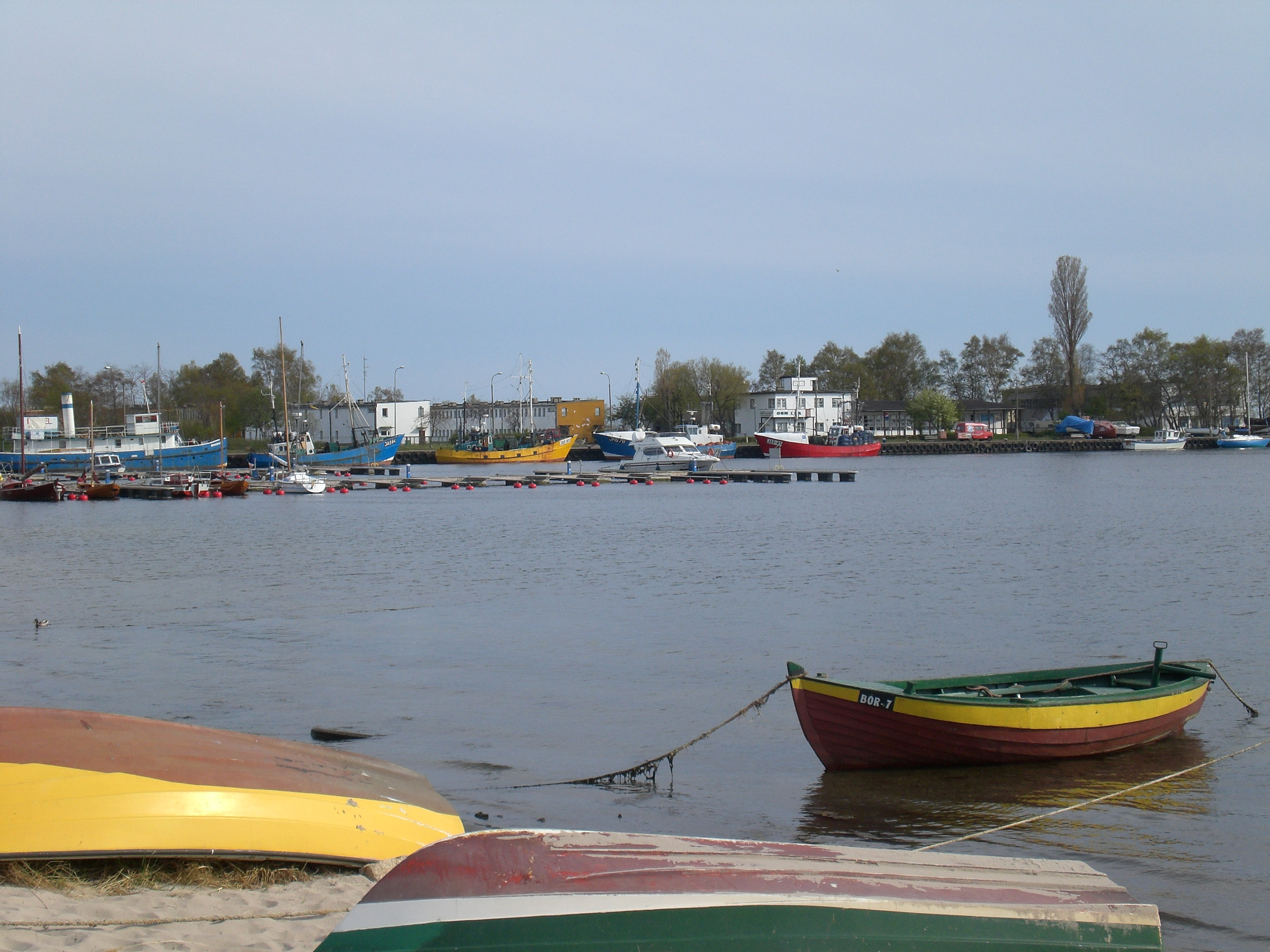
Jastarnia Port

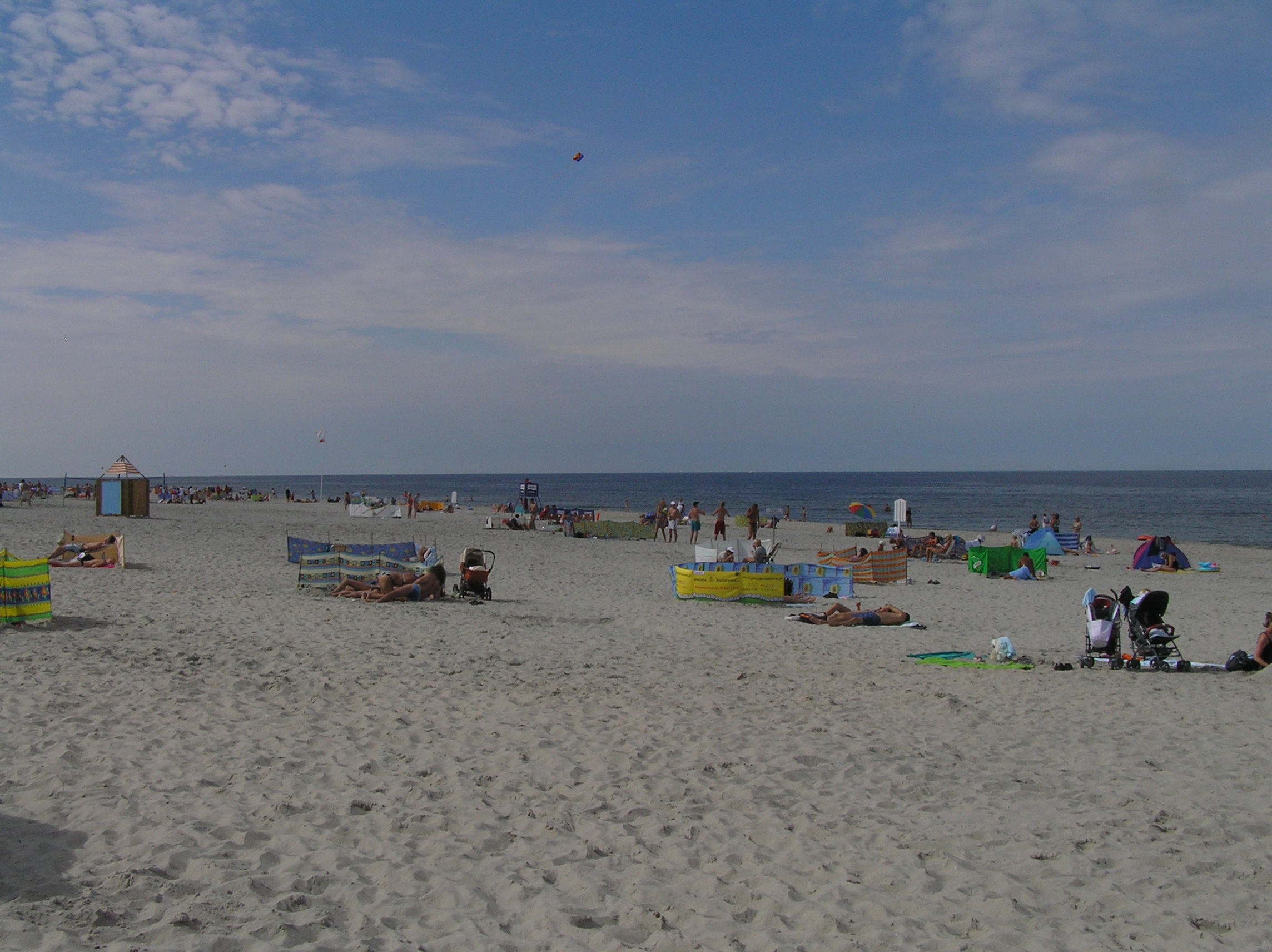

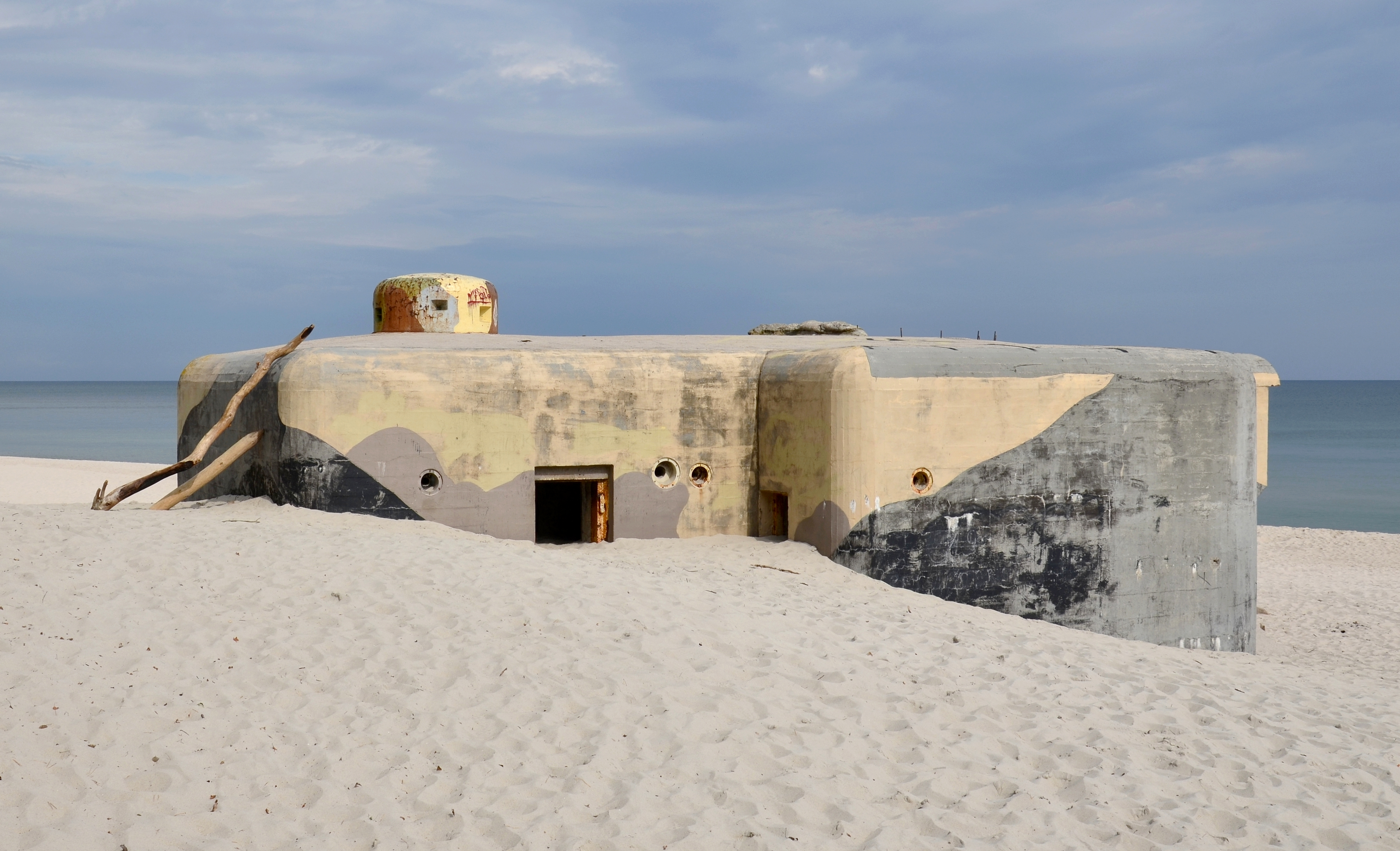

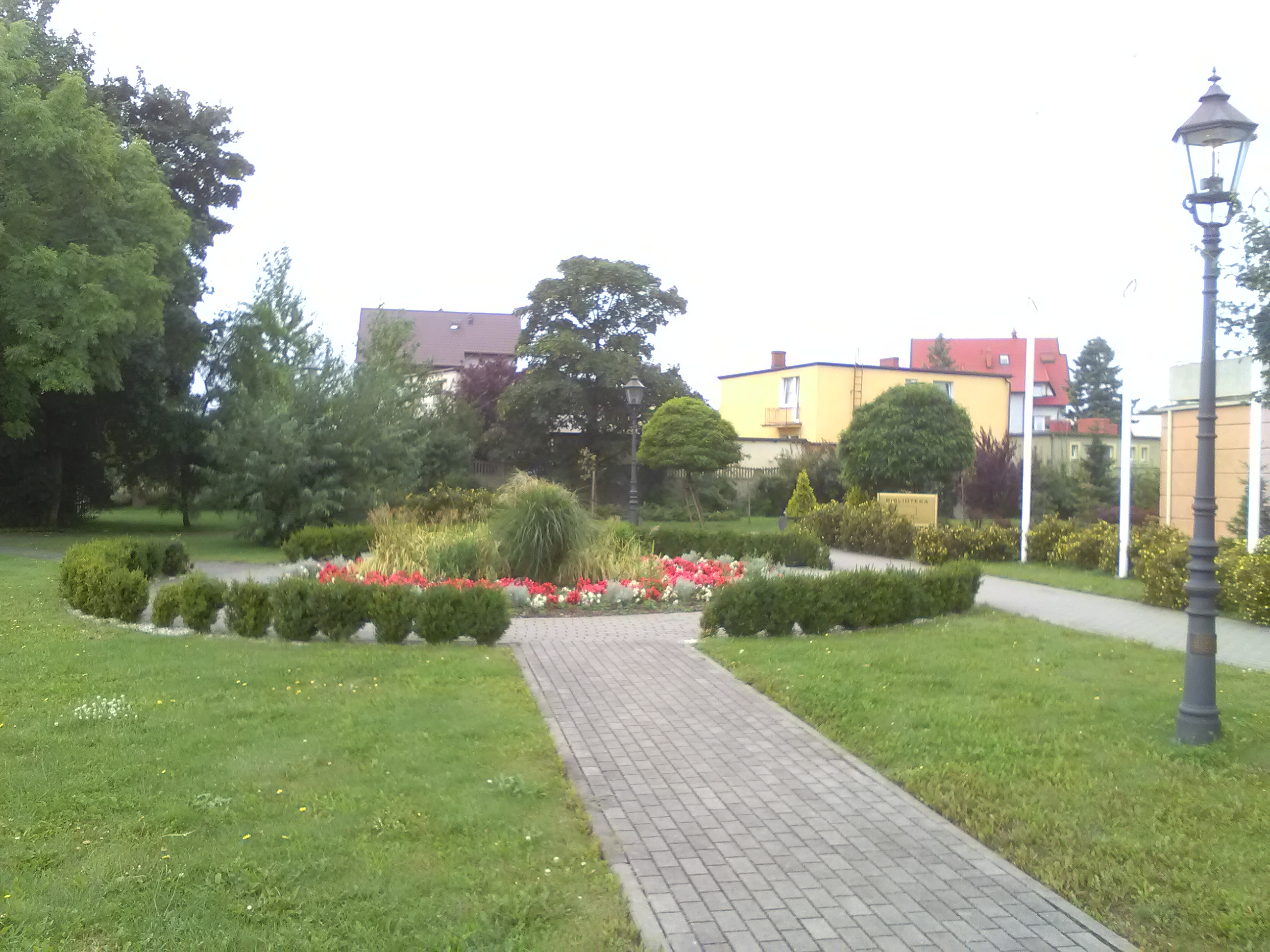

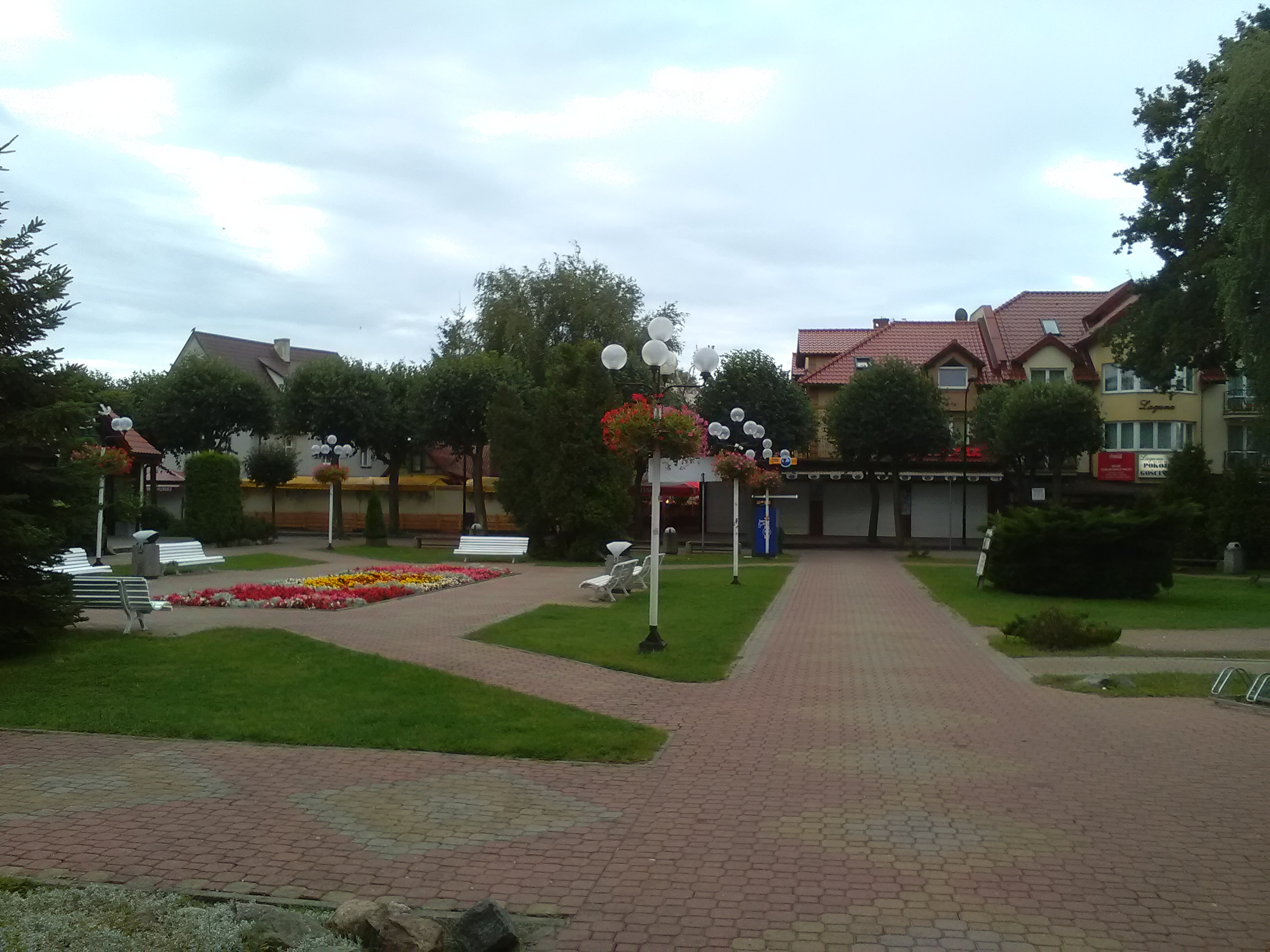

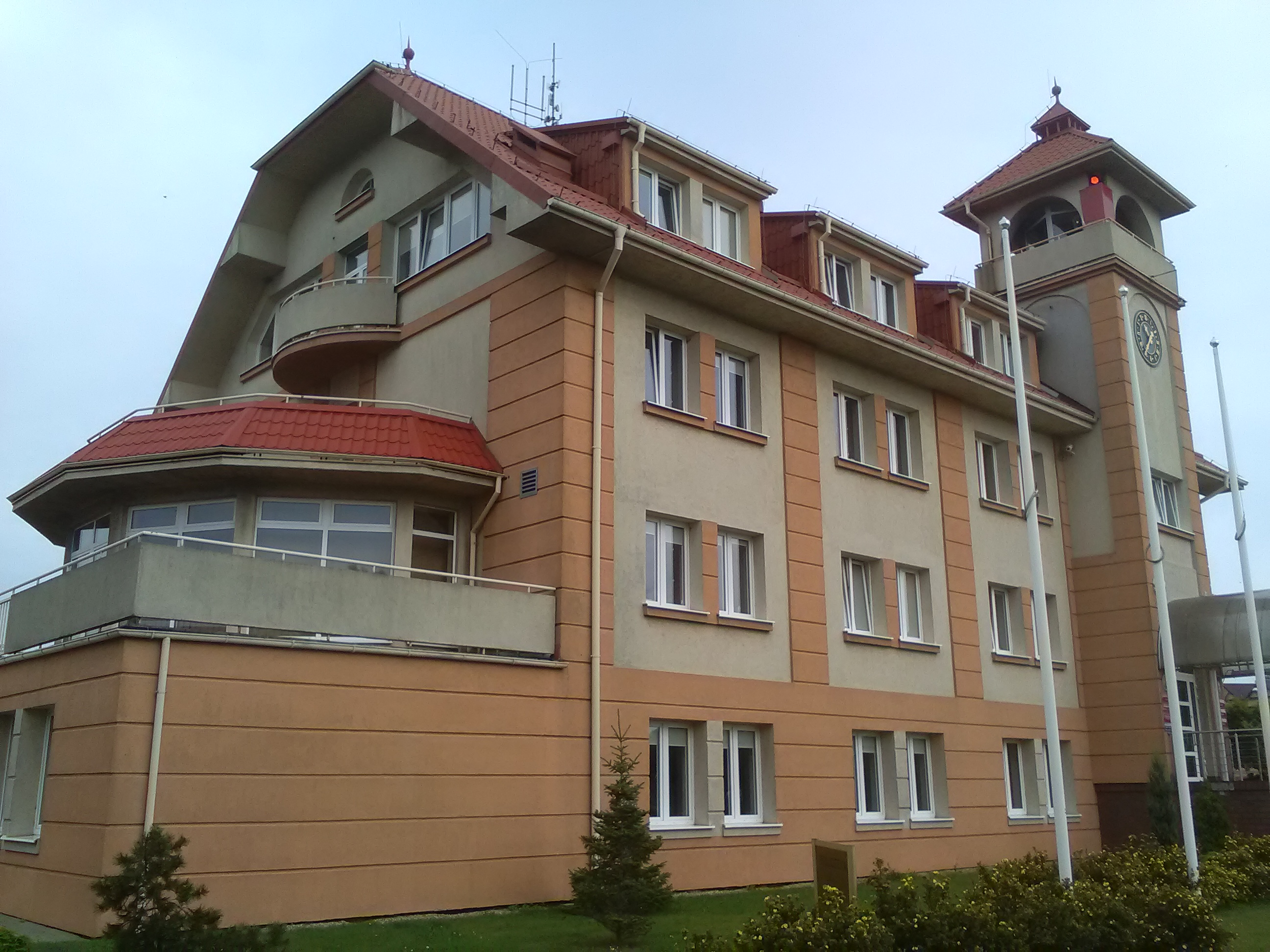
Jastarnia town Hall
