= Jurata =

- Village
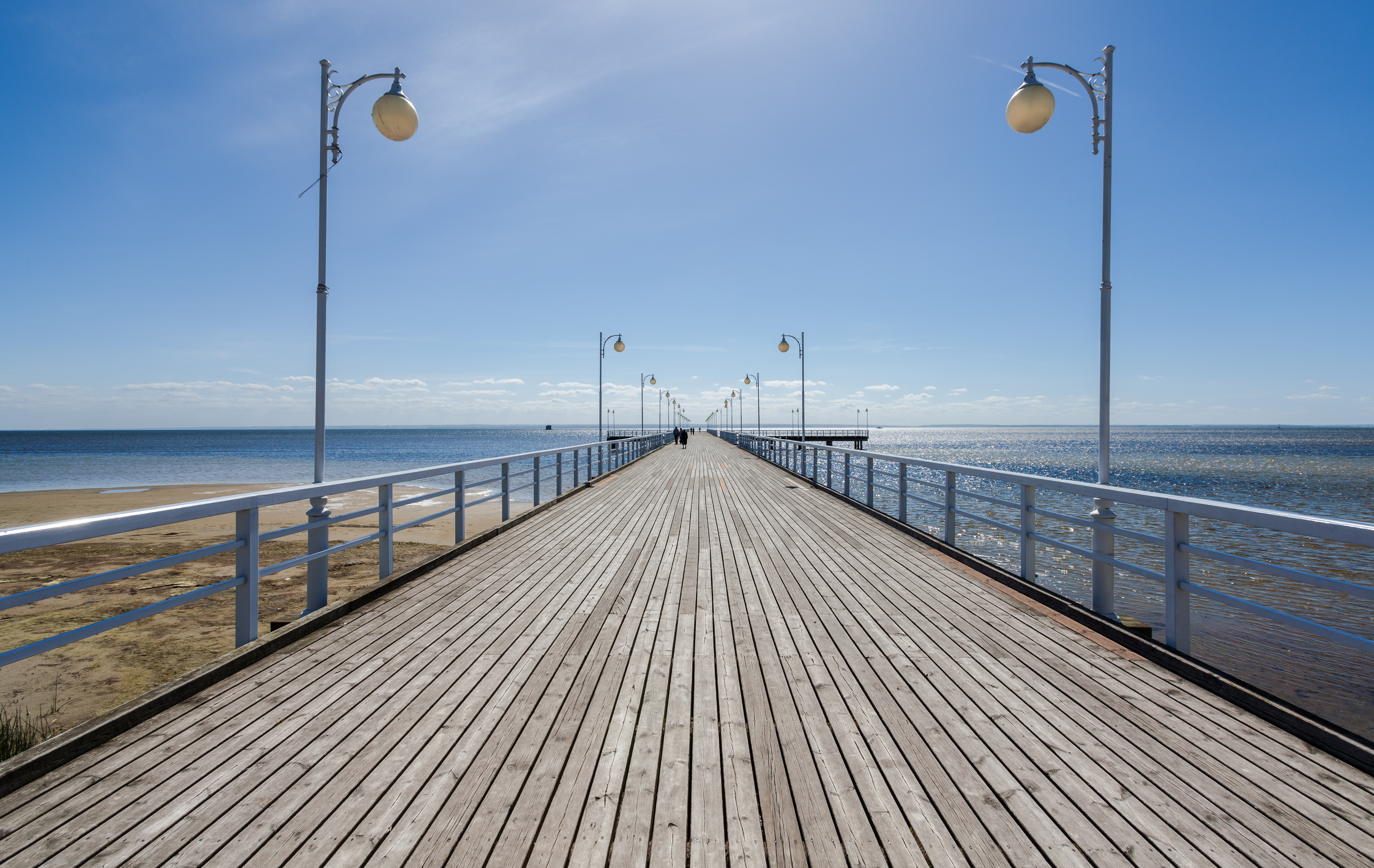
- Pier in Jurata

- Location within Poland Location within Pomeranian Voivodeship
- Coordinates: 54°40′N 18°43′E
- Country: Poland
- Voivodeship: Pomeranian
- County: Puck
- Gmina: Jastarnia
- Founded: 1928
- Time zone: UTC+1 (CET)
  - Summer (DST): UTC+2 (CEST)
- Vehicle registration: GPU

Jurata is a settlement and seaside resort in northern Poland, located on the Hel Peninsula in a forested area between the towns of Jastarnia and Hel in Puck County, Pomeranian Voivodeship, on the coast of the Baltic Sea.

== History ==
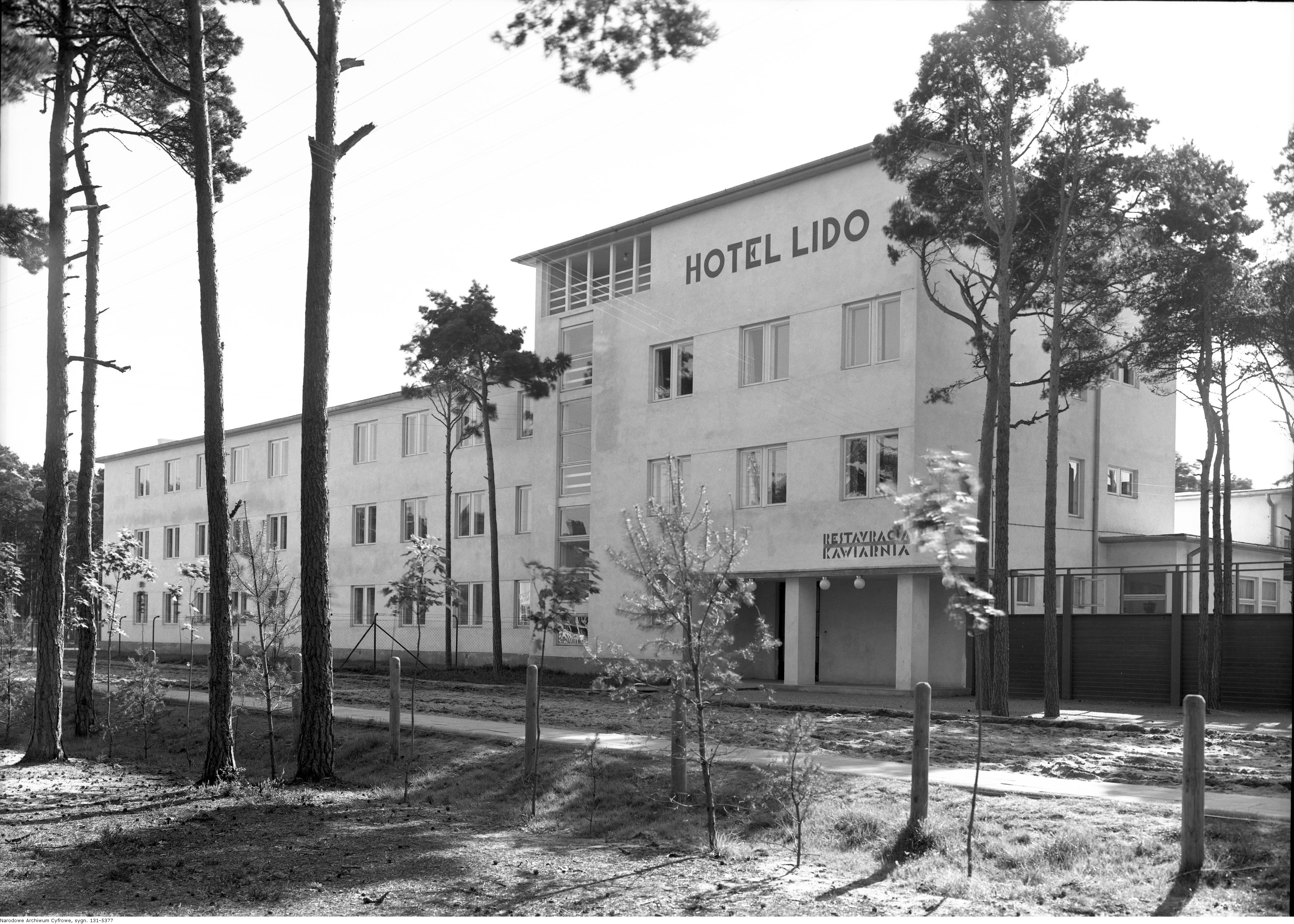
Jurata in 1933

Jurata was established in the interwar period (1928) as a Polish sea side resort, popular especially among Varsovians. Its name comes from the Lithuanian Goddess Jūratė which in Polish is spelled as Jurata.

During the German occupation of Poland (World War II), several Poles from Hel were enslaved as forced labour to serve new German colonists in Jurata.

On 27 June 2026, Jurata was the location of an informal summit attended by President of Poland Karol Nawrocki, President of Estonia Alar Karis, President of Latvia Edgars Rinkēvičs, President of Lithuania Gitanas Nausėda and President of Romania Nicușor Dan, with talks focusing on cooperation on the eastern flank of NATO.

== Gallery ==
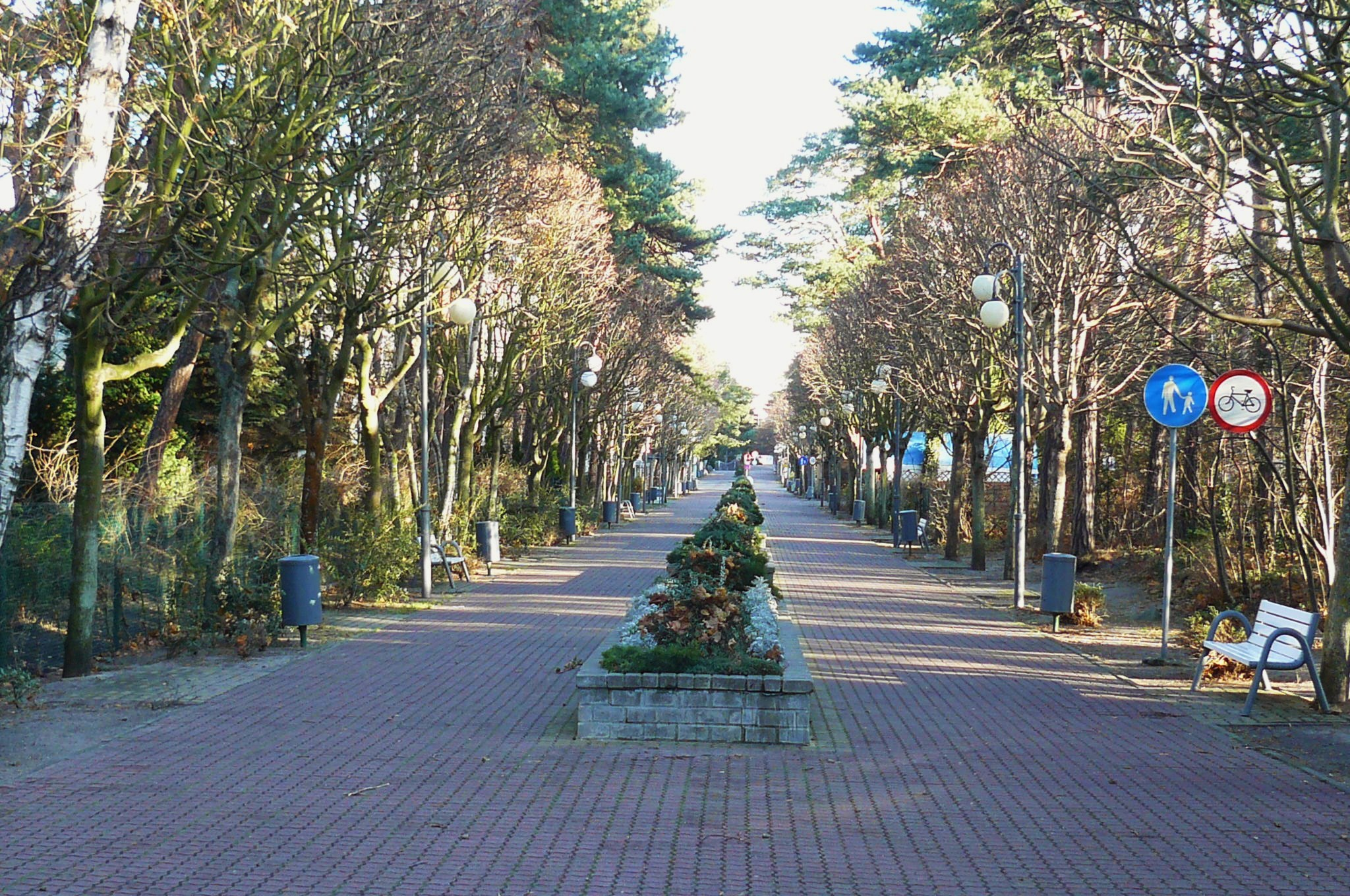
Promenade

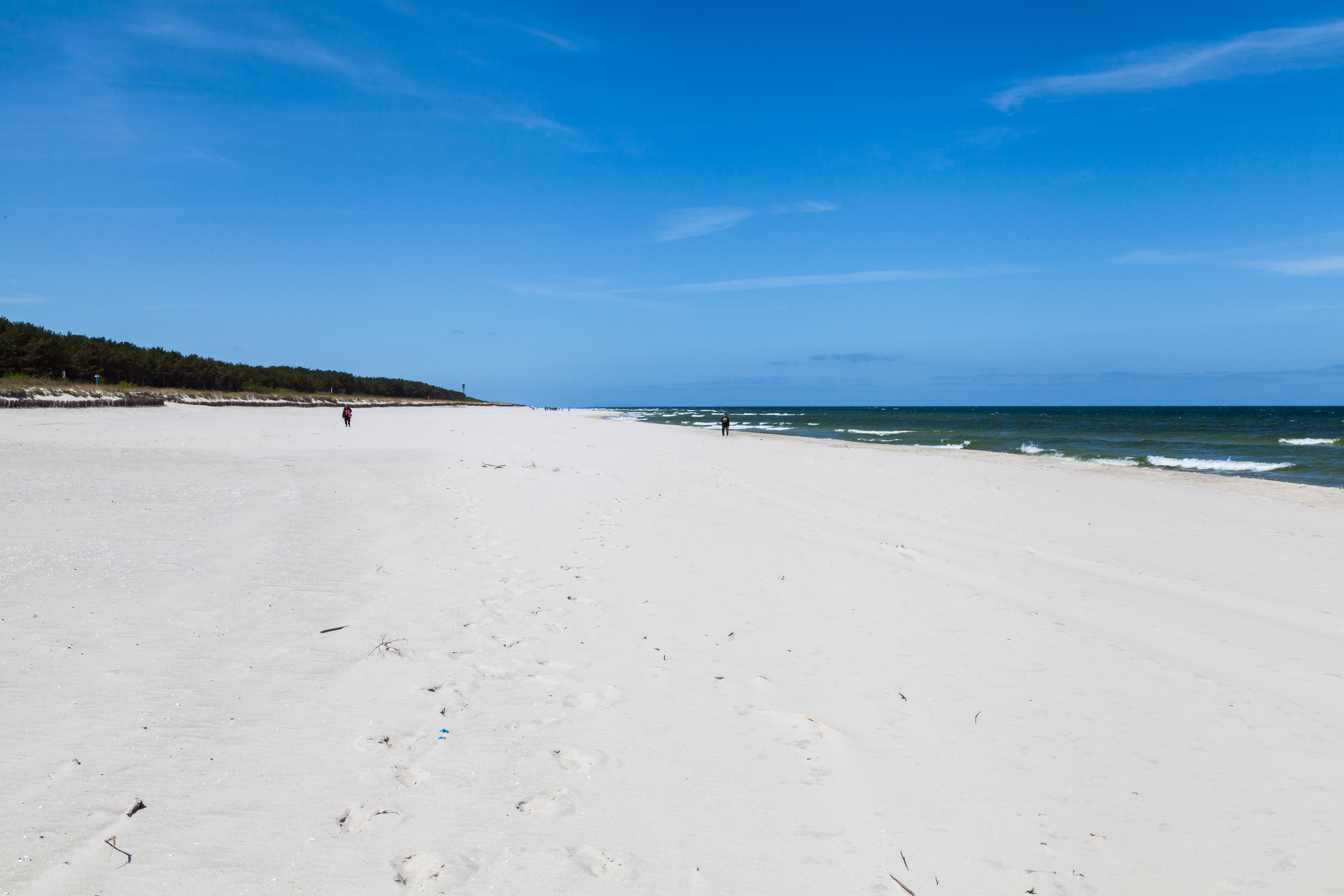
Beach

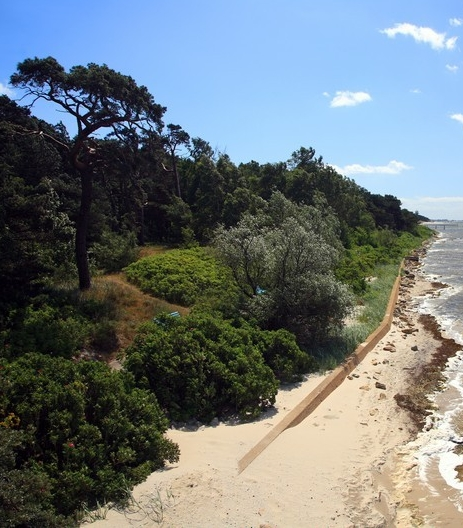
Nature of Jurata

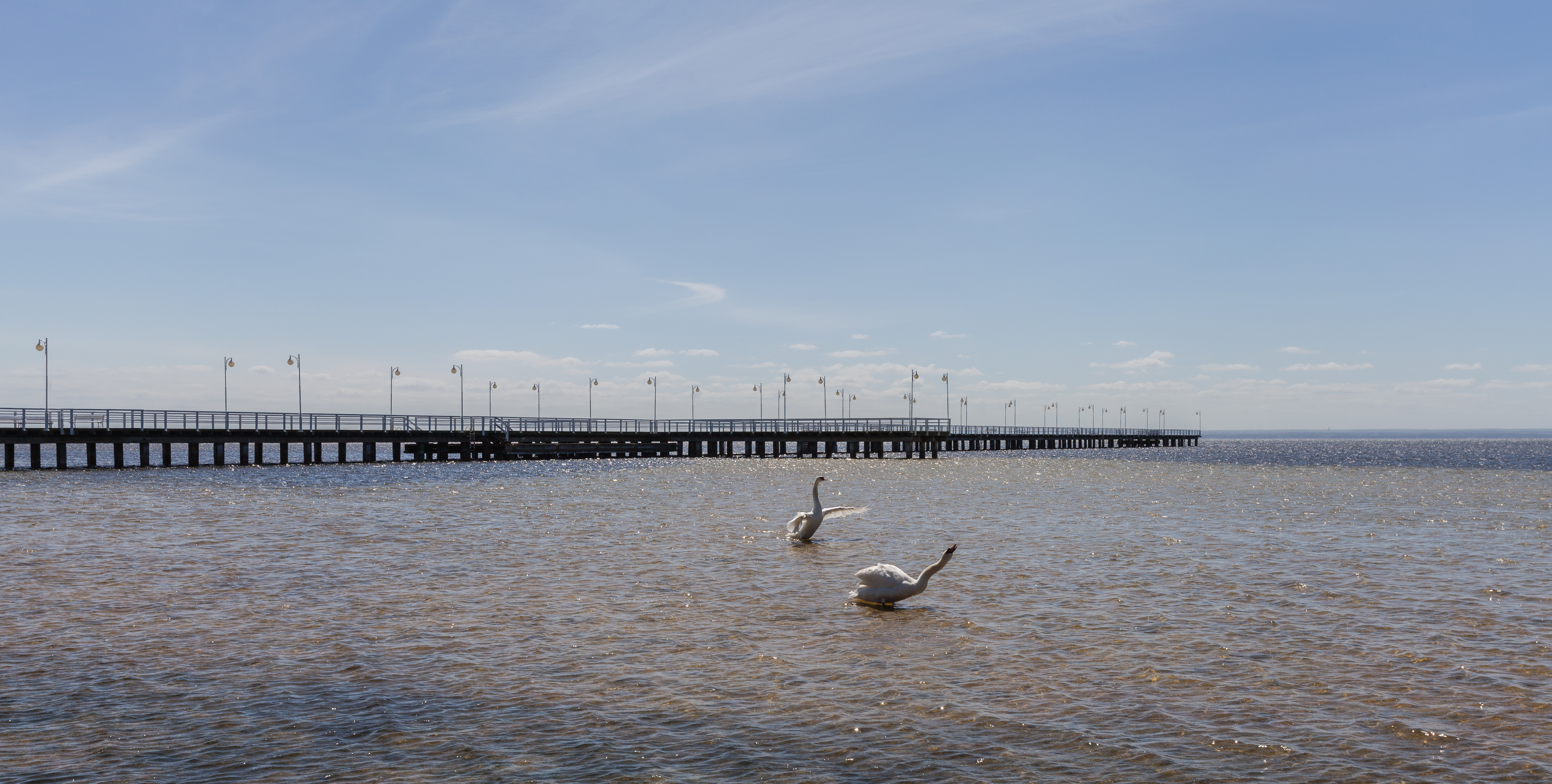
Pier

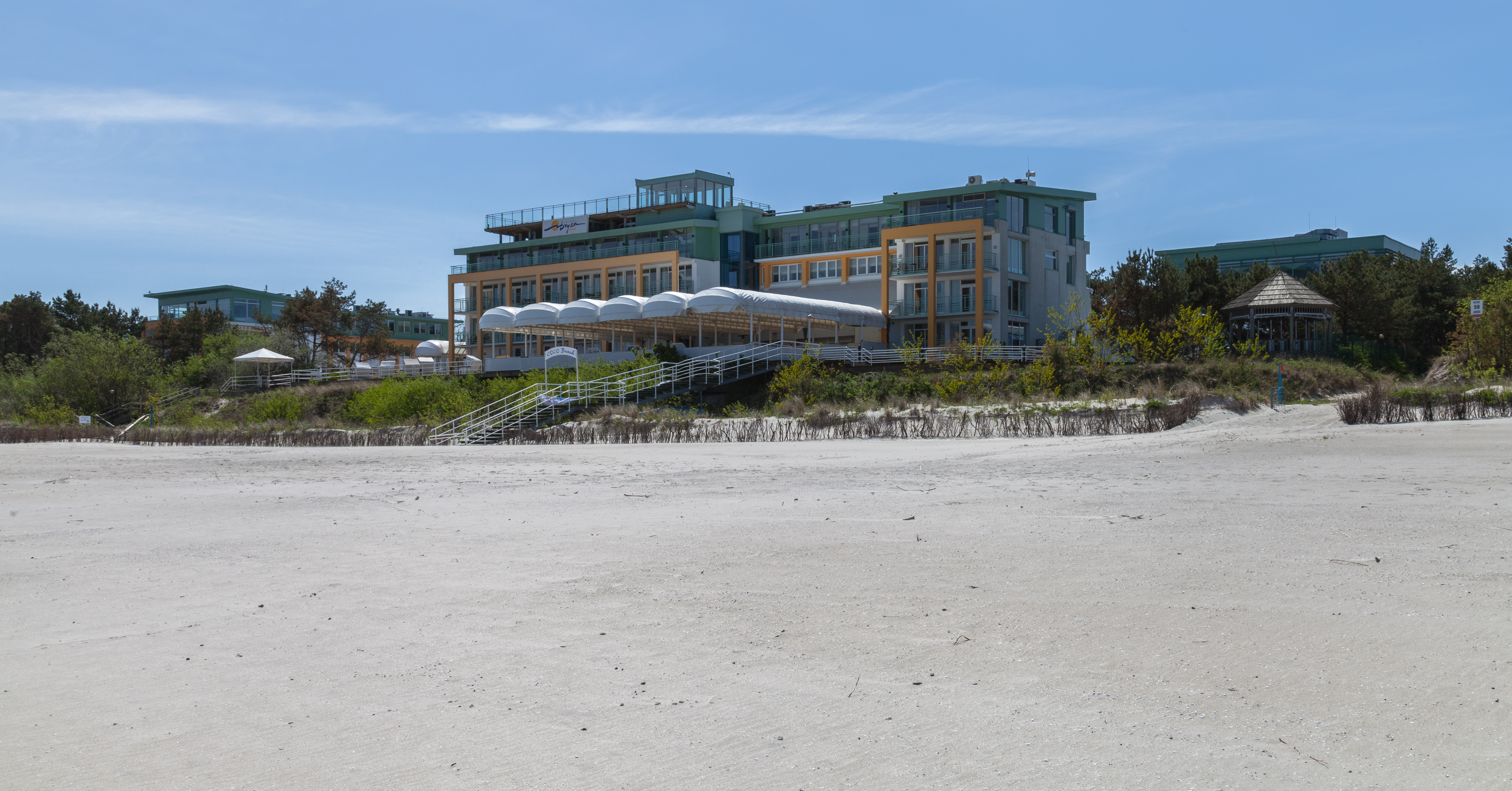
Hotel Bryza Resort

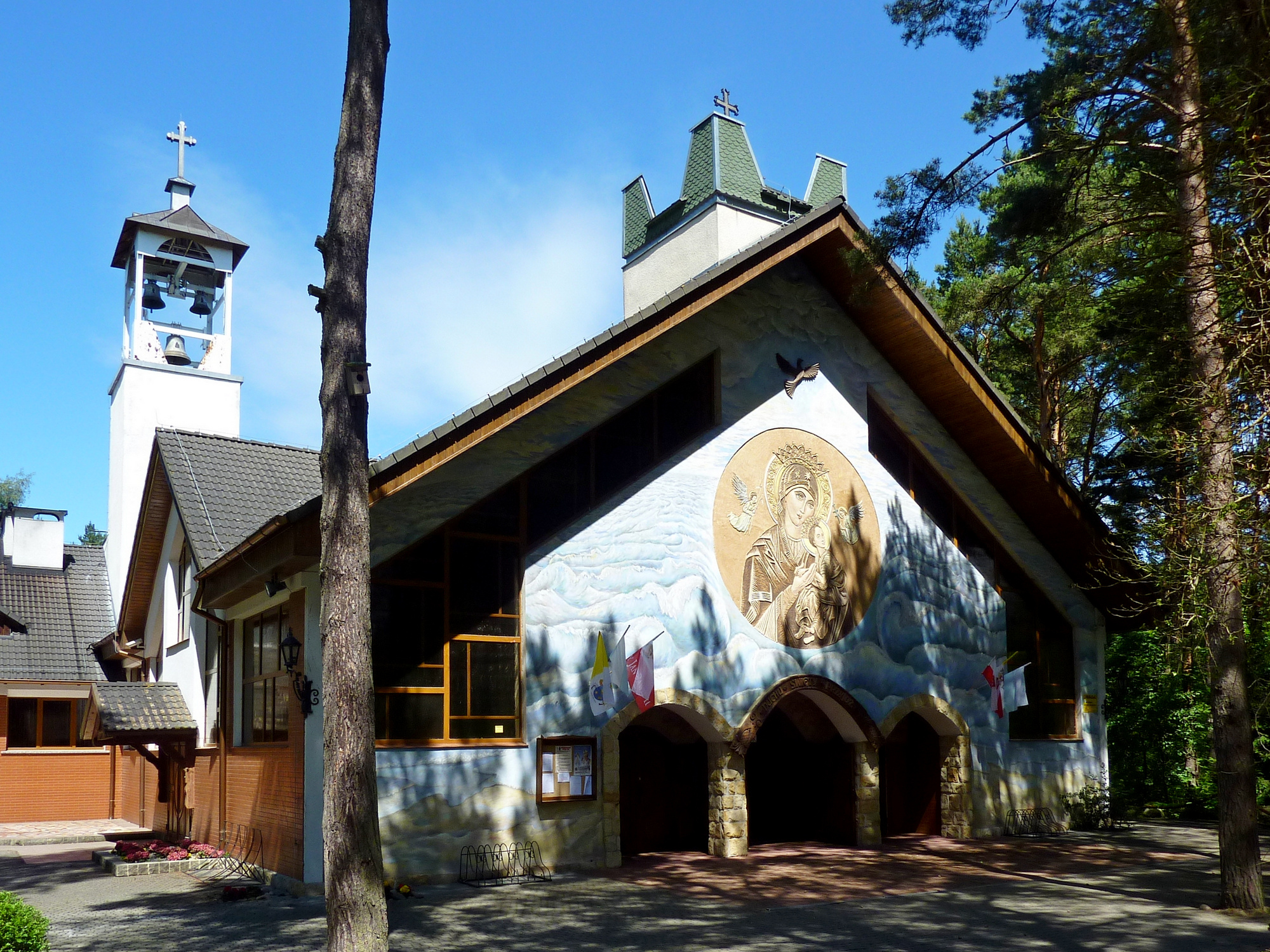
Our Lady of Perpetual Help church

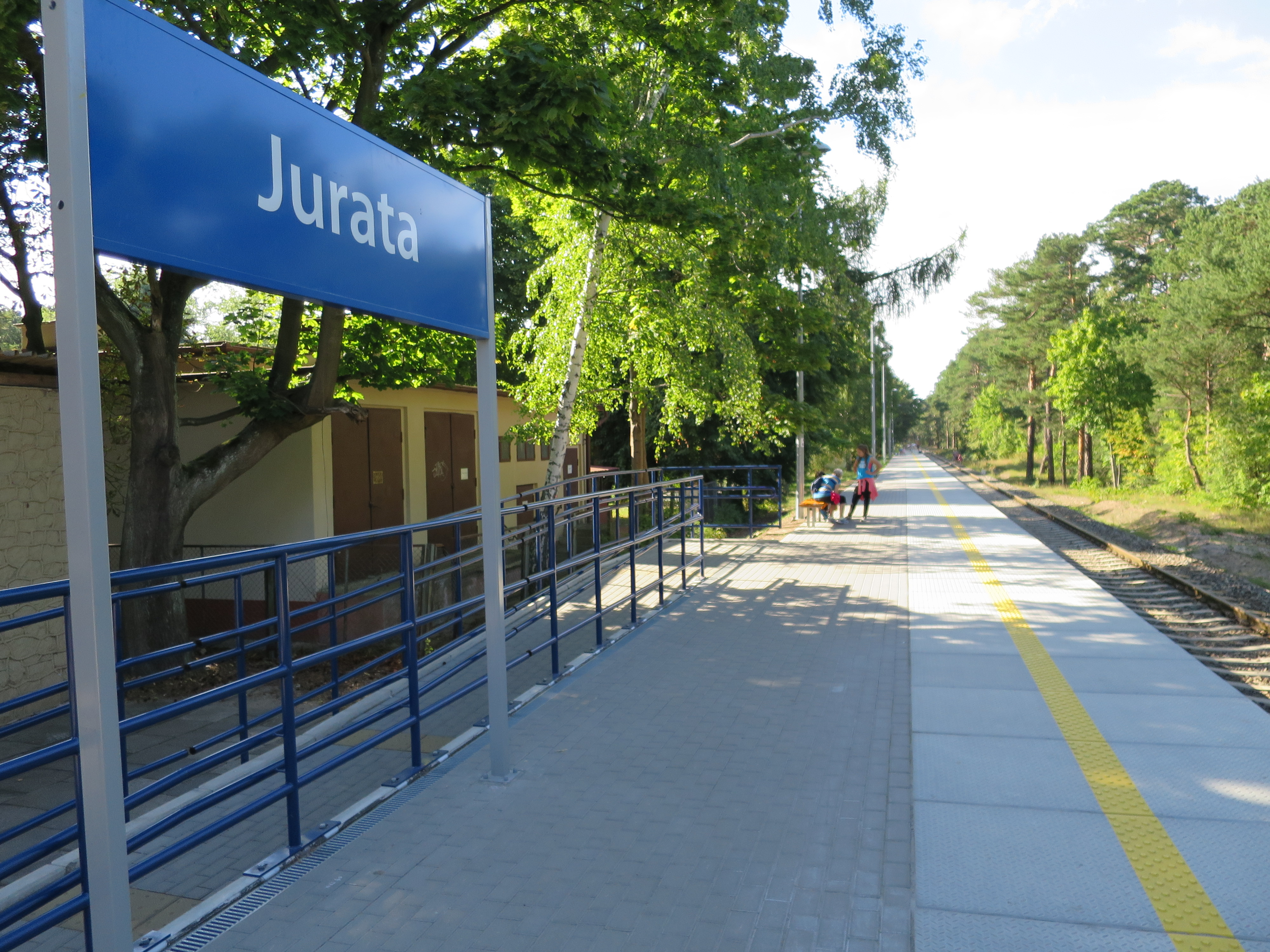
Railway station

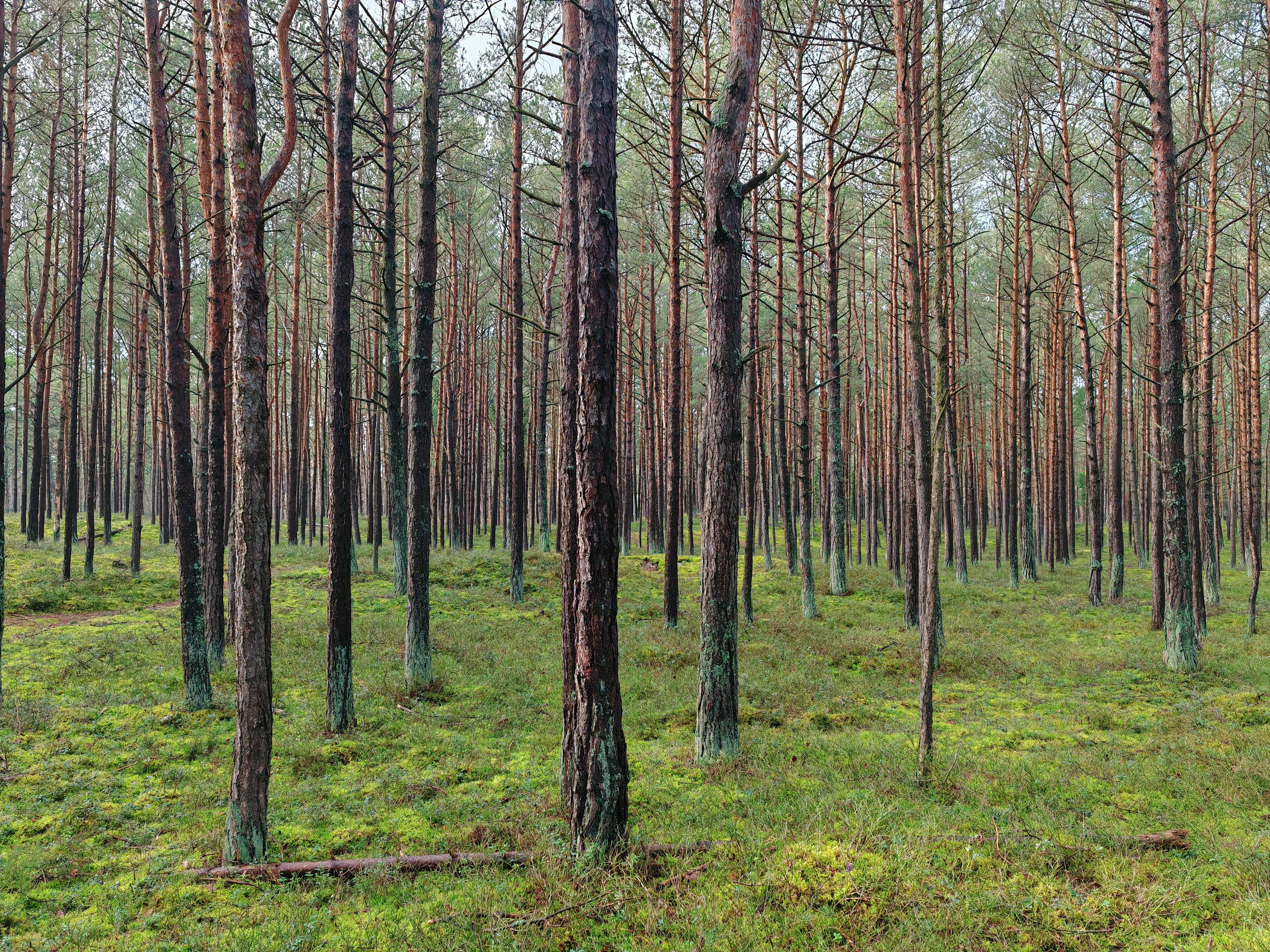
Forest in Jurata
