= List of prisoners of Theresienstadt =

Nazi waystation for extermination camp prisoners

This article lists some notable people who were imprisoned at Theresienstadt Ghetto.

== Notable prisoners who died at the camp ==
- Hans Krasa, composer and musician
- Esther Adolphine, sister of Sigmund Freud (died 29 September 1942)
- Alice Archenhold and Hilde Archenhold, wife and daughter of astronomer Friedrich Simon Archenhold
- Eugen Burg, German film actor (died 17 April 1944)
- Paul Nikolaus Cossmann, editor of the conservative Süddeutsche Monatshefte (died 19 October 1942)
- Ludwig Chodziesner, German lawyer and father of poet Gertrud Kolmar (died February 1943)
- Ludwig Czech, chairman of the German Social Democratic Party in pre-war Czechoslovakia and former Czechoslovak minister of Social Care, Public Affairs and Public Health (died 20 August 1942)
- Robert Desnos, French Surrealist poet (died 8 June 1945)
- Oskar Fischer, physician (died of a heart attack on 28 February 1942)
- Alfred Flatow, German Olympic gymnast, 1896 Olympics gold medallist (died 28 December 1942)
- Gabriel Frankl (born in Pohořelice in 1861), father of Viktor Frankl (died 13 February 1943, from pneumonia and starvation).
- Gisela Januszewska, physician (died 2 March 1943)
- Rudolf Karel, Czech composer (died 6 March 1945)
- Emil Kolben, Czech industrialist (founder of ČKD), one of the founders of industrial use of electricity (died 3 September 1943)
- Clementine Krämer, writer and social worker (died 4 November 1942)
- Gretchen Metzger (née Guldmann), mother of Otto Metzger (died 28 February 1943)
- Friedrich Münzer, German classical scholar (died 20 October 1942)
- Margarethe "Trude" Neumann (born 1893), daughter of Theodor Herzl (died 1943)
- Auguste van Pels, German Jewish refugee who lived in the Secret Annex with Anne Frank. (It is believed that she died during an evacuation transport of prisoners from Raguhn, a subcamp of Buchenwald to Theresienstadt), (died April 1945)
- Georg Alexander Pick, Austrian mathematician, creator of Pick's theorem (died 26 July 1942 after two weeks' imprisonment)
- Ludwig Pick, German pathologist after whom Niemann-Pick disease and Lubarsch-Pick syndrome are named (died 3 February 1944)
- Samuel Schallinger, Austrian businessman, co-owner of the Imperial and the Bristol hotels in Vienna (died 1942)
- Margarete Schiff, daughter of psychotherapist Josef Breuer (died 9 September 1942)
- Zikmund Schul, composer (died 2 June 1944)
- Amalie Seckbach (née Buch), a noted painter and sculptor (died 10 August 1944)
- Mathilde Sussin, actress (died 2 August 1943)
- Alfred Tauber, Austrian and Slovak mathematician (died 26 July 1942)
- Ernestine Taube, mother of pianist/composer Artur Schnabel, remained in Vienna after the Anschluss and at the age of 83, in August 1942, was deported to Theresienstadt concentration camp, where she died two months later.
- Josefine Winter, daughter of Helene and Rudolf Auspitz

== Notable survivors ==
- H. G. Adler, German-speaking writer and scholar
- Karel Ančerl, Czech conductor
- Inge Auerbacher, author of 6 books (including three memoirs about her experiences in Terezin and recovering after the war), and the subject of a new play, The Star on My Heart (November 2015)
- Yehuda Bacon, Israeli artist
- Leo Baeck, German rabbi
- Aviva Bar-On has lived in Israel since 1949. She is known to have sung in 2018, during a concert celebrating Independence Day in Jerusalem, one of the poet Ilse Weber's songs that was transmitted to her orally and her memory was the only record.
- Elsa Bernstein, Austrian-German playwright
- Ilse Blumenthal-Weiss, German poet
- Charlotta Burešová, Czech painter
- Ellen Burka, Dutch-Canadian figure skater and coach
- Bela Dekany, Hungarian Jewish-born renowned British violinist and leader of the BBC Symphony Orchestra
- Arthur Eichengrün, German chemist who invented anti-gonorrhoea drug Protargol
- Kurt Epstein, Czech Olympic water polo competitor
- Emil František Burian, Czech communist playwright, actor, composer and writer
- Viktor Frankl, Austrian neurologist and psychologist
- Jaro Fürth, Austrian actor
- Petr Ginz, Czech child prodigy writer, died in Auschwitz in 1944
- Richard Glazar and Karel Unger, they were subsequently transferred to Treblinka, from which they ultimately escaped
- Michael Gruenbaum, writer
- Alena Hájková, Czech historian and resistance fighter
- Alice Herz-Sommer, Czech pianist; the focus of the documentary The Lady in Number 6. Died at 110 years old on 23 February 2014, oldest known survivor of the Holocaust.
- Fredy Hirsch, deputy leader of the children at Theresienstadt, deported 8 September 1943 to Auschwitz and died 8 March 1944
- Milada Horáková, Czech politician
- Berthold Jeiteles, scientist, Talmudic scholar, and descendant of notable Prague family
- Ivan Klíma, Czech novelist
- Egon Lánský, Czech journalist and politician of Slovak origin
- Gidon Lev, Czech-born Israeli TikTok star and Holocaust educator
- Arnošt Lustig, Czech novelist
- Paul Mahrer, professional soccer player (died 1984)
- Ferdinand Münz (1888-1969), chemist. The inventor of EDTA.
- Oskar Neumann, Czech lawyer and former president of the Slovak Jewish Council
- Arnošt Reiser, professor of chemistry, author and inventor
- Zuzana Růžičková, Czech harpsichordist
- Jo Spier, illustrator
- Peter Spier, Author and illustrator of children's books
- Sam Swaap, Dutch violinist and conductor
- Emil Utitz, German-language academic
- Ronald Waterman
- Ela Weissberger, the Cat in Brundibár (performed in schools around the world in memory of the children who did not survive)
