= Tatra T6 =

The Tatra T6 is a family of trams from the Czech manufacturer Tatra ČKD built in Prague. It was a continuation of the Tatra T5 type.

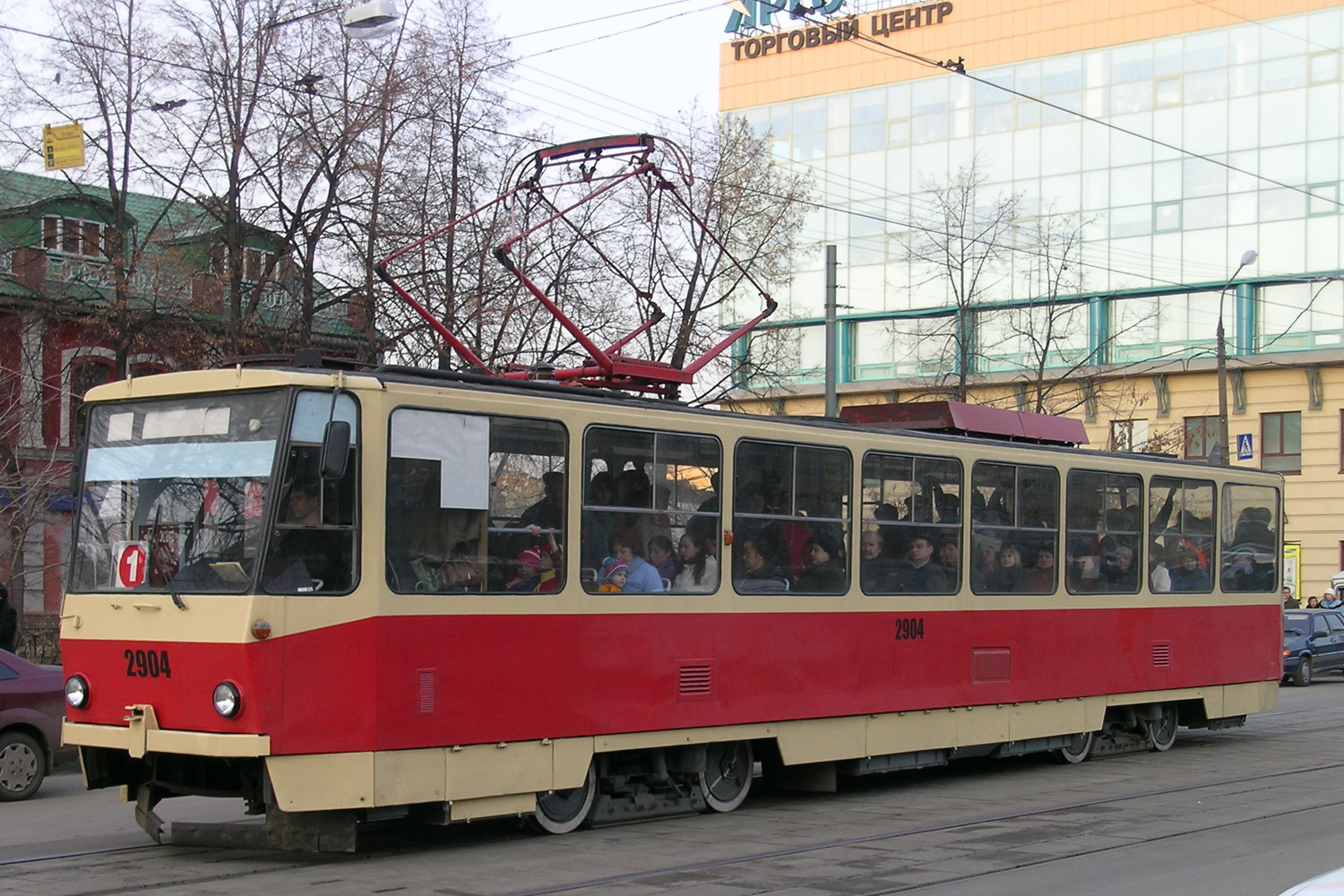
T6B5SU in Nizhny Novgorod

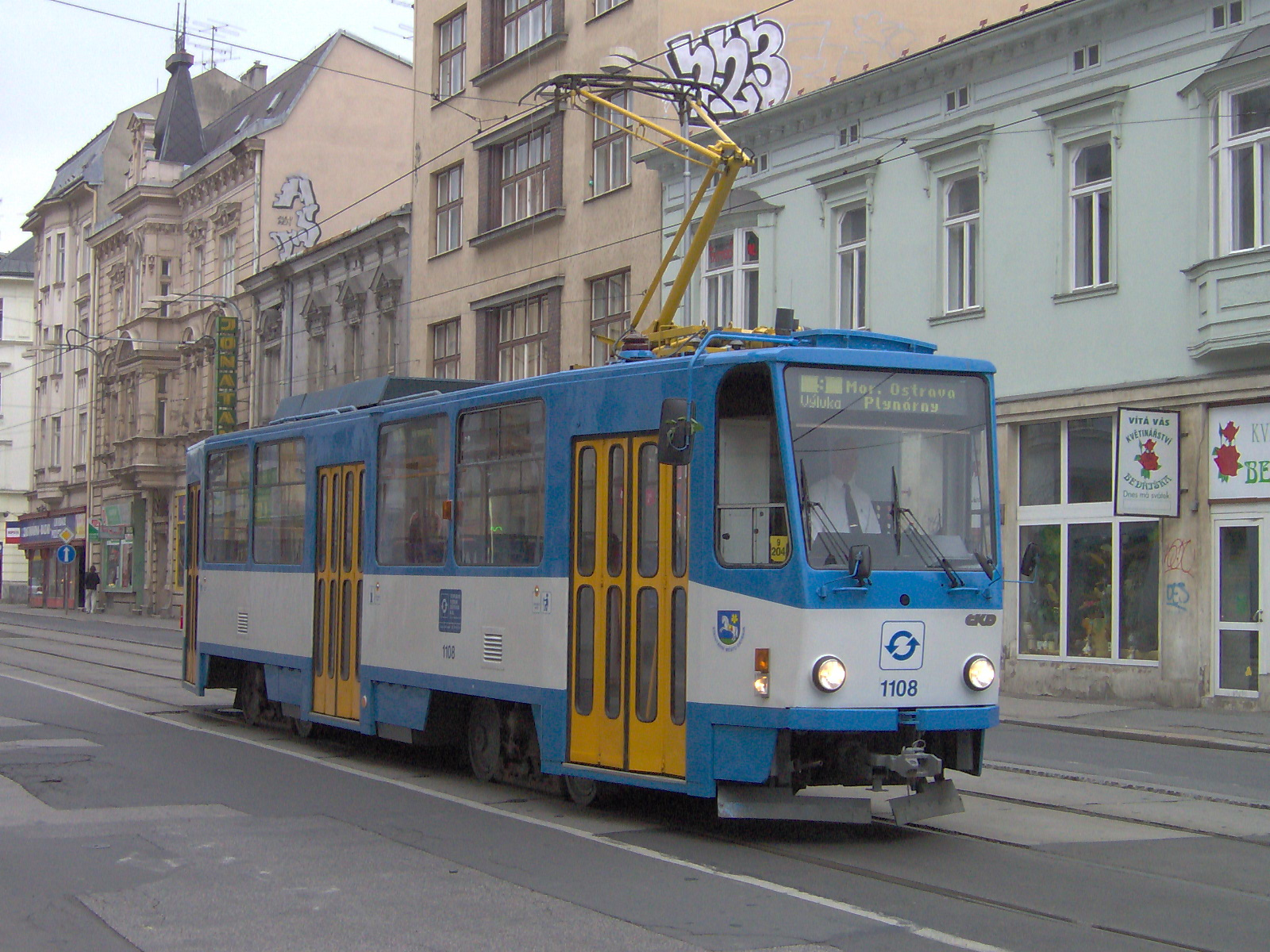
T6A5 in Ostrava

The cars had an all-steel welded construction with large side windows and a high ceiling. From the factory they were equipped with semi-automatic ESW couplers, which allowed two cars to run with the electric current being drawn through a single collector. The interior walls and ceiling were covered with plasterboard and hardboard, and the driver's cab was served by a sliding door and a large instrument panel.

T6 Subtypes
Subtype	Introduced	Length	Width	Height
T6A2	1985	14,500	2,200	3,110
T6A5	1991	14,700	2,500	3,165
T6B5	1983	15,300	2,500	3,145
T6C5	1998	14,700	2,500	3,165
