= Trams in Szczecin =

Overview of the tram system of Szczecin, Poland

Coordinates: 53.4381°N 14.5422°E

- Tramwaje w Szczecinie

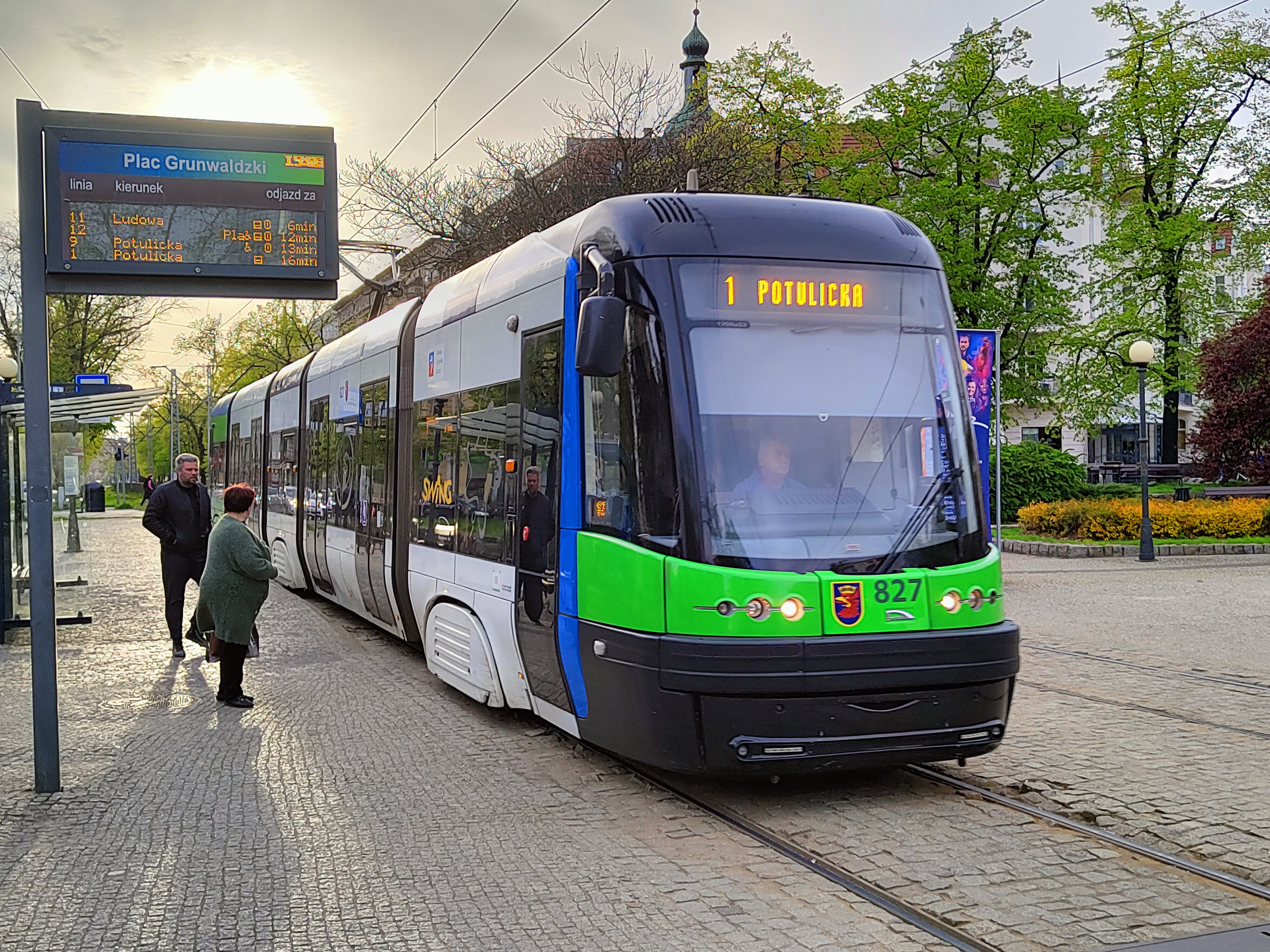
- Pesa Swing in Szczecin, 2023

Operation
- Locale: Szczecin, Poland
- Open: 1879
- Status: operational
- Lines: 12+1 (tourist line)
- Operator: Tramwaje Szczecińskie (since 2009)

Infrastructure
- Track gauge: 1,435 mm (4 ft 8 1/2 in) standard gauge
- Electrification: 600 V DC OHL

Statistics
- Track length (total): 114 km
- Route length: 65,5 km
- Stops: 101
Horsecar era: 1879–1900
- Status: Converted to electricity
- Operator: Stettiner Straßen-Eisenbahn Gesellschaft
- Track gauge: 1,435 mm (4 ft 8 1/2 in) standard gauge
- Propulsion system: horses
- Depot: 3
- Stock: 20
Overview
- Website: http://ts.szczecin.pl/

The Szczecin tram system is a 12-line, standard gauge tramway system in Szczecin, Poland, that has been in operation since 1879 (when the town was Stettin, Prussia). The tramway operates on 65 kilometers (40 mi) of route. There are two depots and twelve balloon loops (including five street ones). Daytime lines (night lines were abolished in 1996) are operated by the company Tramwaje Szczecińskie (Szczecin Tramways), on behalf of the ZDiTM (Zarząd Dróg i Transportu Miejskiego; Road and Public Transport Administration). There is also a tourist line operated by the Szczecin's Association of the Enthusiasts of Public Transport.

== History ==
=== Horse trams ===
On October 21, 1872, just before the demolition of fortress walls, German engineer Johannes Bussing received from the Royal Police Directorate in Berlin concession for the construction of a horse tram network. Less than six years later, an important agreement with the city have been signed . On March 25, 1879, the company Stettiner Straßen-Eisenbahn Gesellschaft was established in the same year the first horse tram lines were launched. On August 23, the first line, which began nearby of pl. Gałczyńskiego, lead through pl. Zwycięstwa and ended at Staszica Street. On October 16, the second line from Wiszesława Street to Potulicka Street was opened. The length of both routes rose to 11.5 km. Initially, in Szczecin there was 16 trams and 80 horses, and in 1898 there were 39 trams and 198 horses. In 1886, two new lines were opened : from the Szczecin Główny railway station to Chmielewskiego Street and from Wyszyńskiego Street to Nabrzeże Wieleckie. The first depot was located at the intersection of Wojska Polskiego avenue and Piotra Skargi Street. Later another 3 were established : at Dębogórska Street, Dubois Street and Kolumba Street.

=== Electric trams to 1945 ===
From 1896 to 1900, most of lines had become electric. Electrification have been performed by Allgemeine Elektrizitäts-Gesellschaft. The main tram routes had two tracks, the other routes had only one track. Electricity have been brought by power stations located in Pomorzany, Old Town and Gdańska Street. In 1904, except for colors, tram lines also became numbers:

- 1 Westend (Łękno) – Lastadie (Łasztownia) (yellow)
- 2 Berliner Tor (Brama Portowa) – Zentralfriedhof (Cmentarz Centralny) (gray)
- 3 Nemitz (Niemierzyn) – Hauptbahnhof (Dworzec Główny) (orange)
- 4 Pommerensdorf (Pomorzany) – Arndtplatz (pl. Szarych Szeregów) (green)
- 5 Alleestr. (Wawrzyniaka) – Turnerstr. (Jagiellońska) – Unterwiek (Jana z Kolna) (blue)
- 6 Hauptbahnhof – Zabelsdorf (Niebuszewo) (white)
- 7 Frauendorf (Golęcino) – Bellevue (Potulicka) (red)

In 1903 the first line was built, which crossed Odra and reached the right bank of city – a new line was opened through Most Długi to ul. Energetyków, and in 1910 through Most Kłodny to Wendy Street at Łasztownia. In 1907 was opened Niemierzyn depot (in Niemierzyńska Street), and 5 years later Golęcin depot (in Wiszesława Street). In 1926, after Wyspa Jaskółcza had been connected (at the back of Depot in Kolumba Street) with city, on the island have been located a storehouse. In 1927, after Daibe Airport had been built, nearby have been constructed a new tram balloon loop. The tram route has led in those days through 4 bridges: Długi and Cłowy, Portowy, and above Regaliczka and Cłowy. It was the only one at the right bank of Szczecin. Before 1929, electric traction was installed above bridges . Earlier trams had been passing those bridges by increasing their speed in front of bridges. Because of inhabitants' requests, already working tram lines have been expanded. The average speed of trams was about 16 km/h. Since 1928, in Szczecin, apart from tram system, there are also city buses. List of tram lines in 1929:

- 1 Rennbahn (Tor kolarski) – Flughafen (Lotnisko)
- 2 Berliner Tor (Brama Portowa) – Wendorf (Słowieńsko)
- 3 Pommerensdorf (Pomorzany) – Eckerberger Wald (Las Arkoński)
- 4 Hauptbahnhof (Dworzec Główny) – Krankenhaus (Szpital)
- 5 Braunsfelde (Pogodno) – Dunzig (Duńczyca)
- 6 Hauptbahnhof (Dworzec Główny) – Bahnhof Zabelsdorf (Dworzec Niebuszewo)
- 7 Bellevue (Potulicka) – Frauendorf (Golęcino)
- 8 Schinkelplatz (plac Kościuszki) – Grabowerstrasse

In 1934 the last tram depot was opened, at 200 Wojska Polskiego Avenue (Zajezdnia Pogodno). In 1940, the total line length measured 50.3 km and trams had transported 58.8 million passengers . After bombardments during World War II, in 1943 and 1944 a lot of routes had been out-of-order, but motorman, owing to their own work, succeeded in launching some of the tram routes.

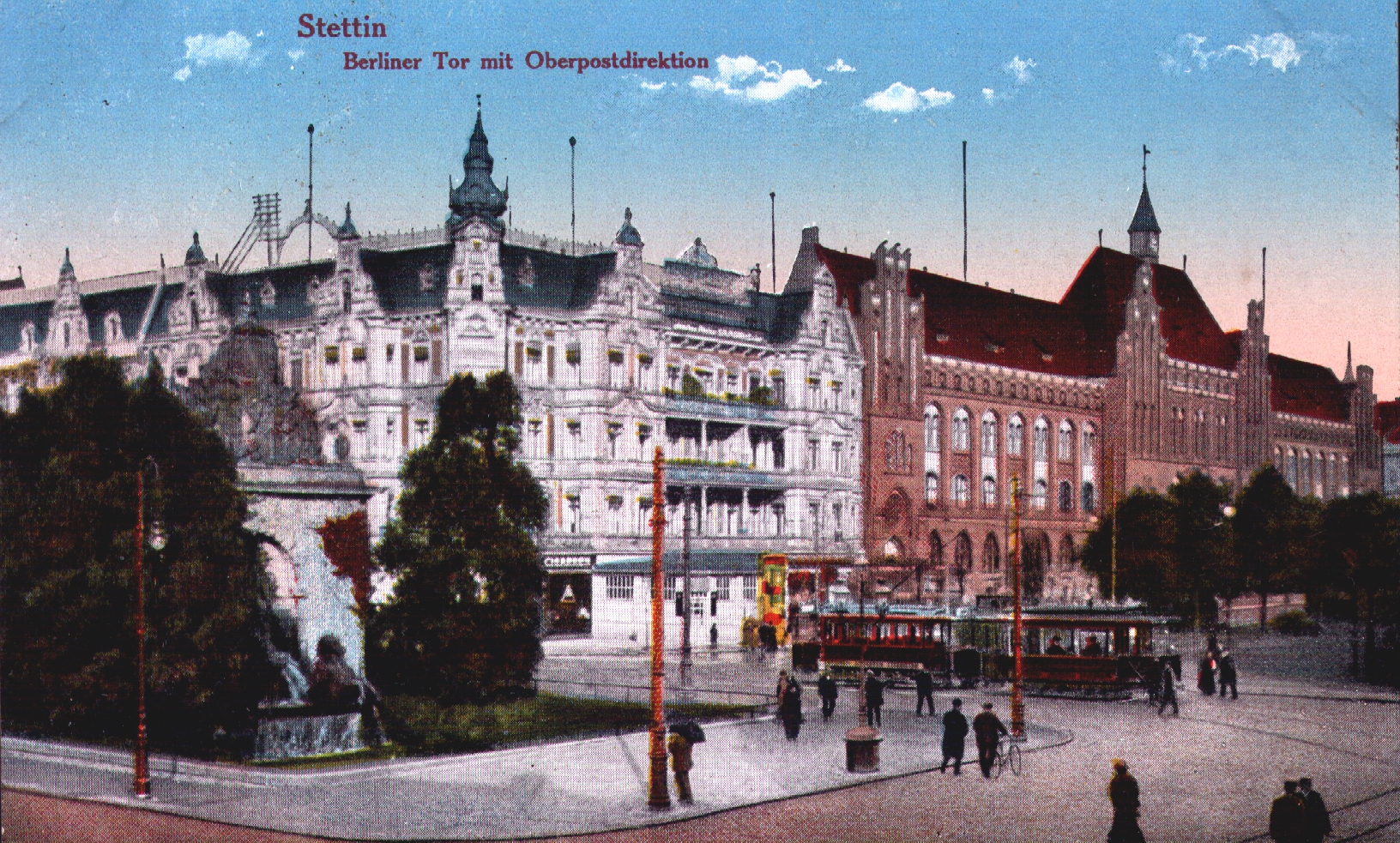
Electric trams near Brama Portowa

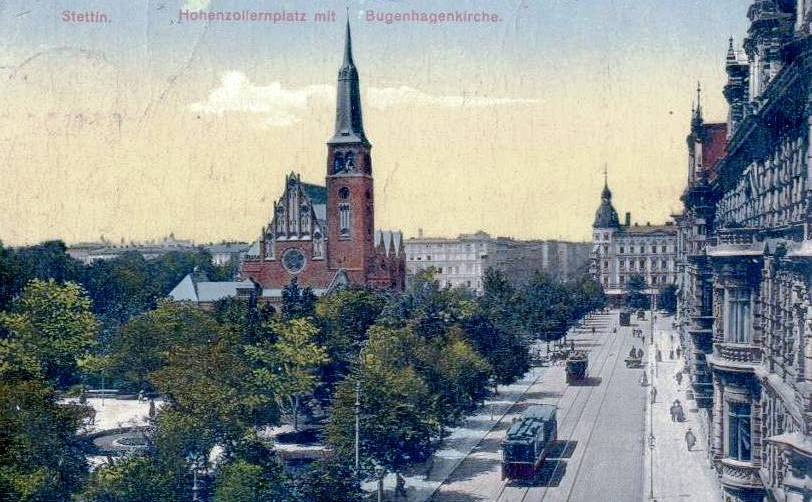
Tram route on Zwycięstwa square

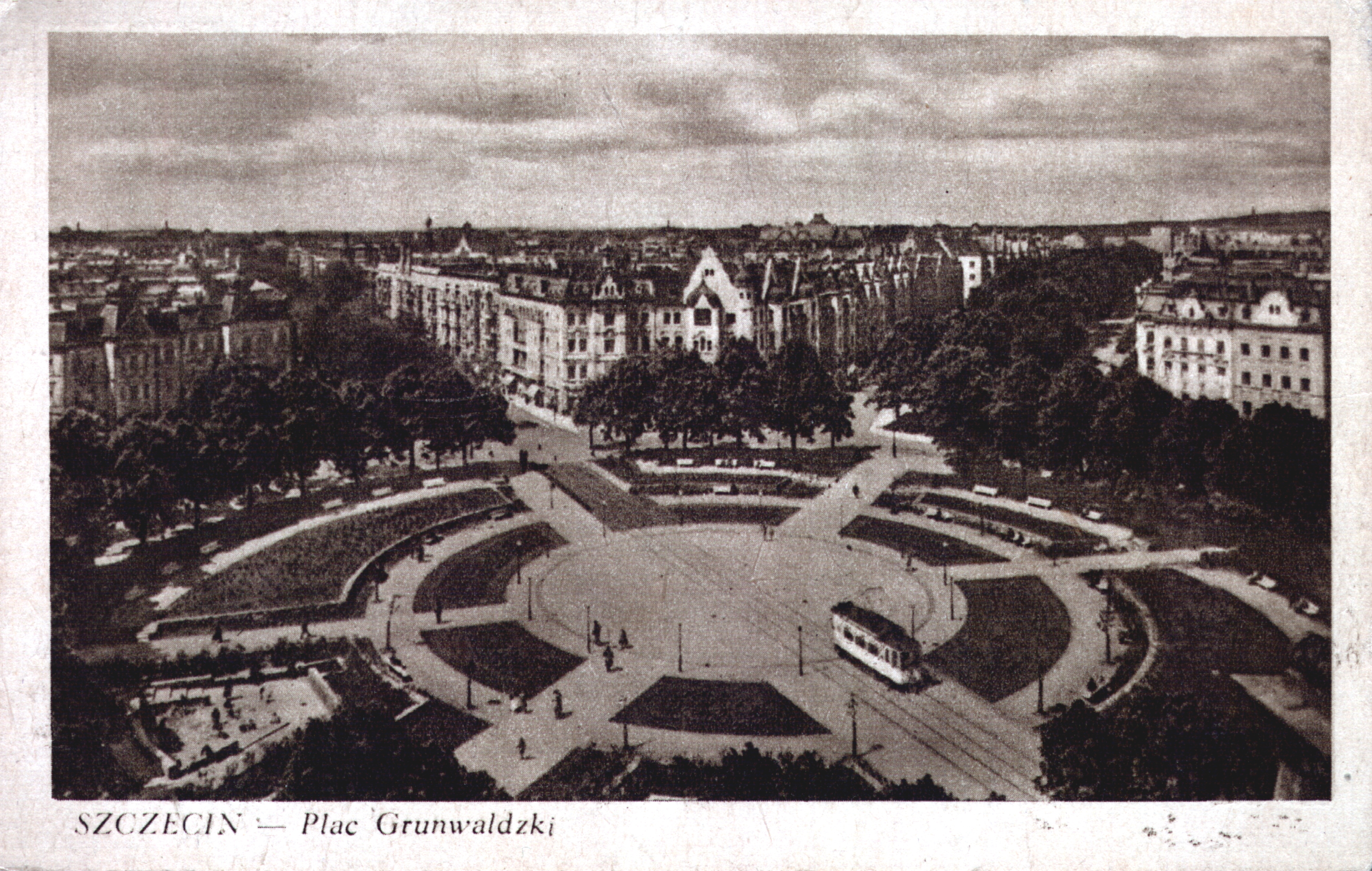
Tram Falkenried on Grunwaldzki square

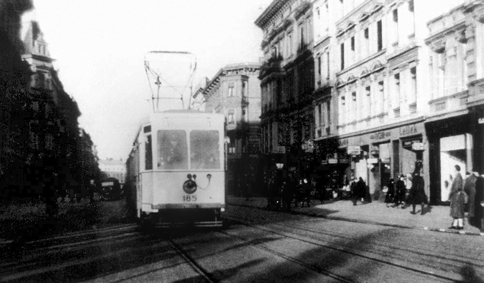
Tram in Wyzwolenia avenue, 1942

=== 1945–1956 ===
During World War II, 45% of tracks were damaged, 75% of electric tractions, and 50% of trams. After the war, only one tram depot was working – depot in Niemierzyńska Street. From Brama Portowa the first postwar line, opened on 12 August 1945. Not all of prewar routes had been rebuilt, like those in Staszica Street, E. Plater Street, Rayskiego Street, part of Malczewskiego Street (from Wyzwolenia avenue to Matejki Street), Wendy Street and through Most Cłowy, while a part of theexisting routes had been extended. The first postwar company to manage public transport in Szczecin, was Tramwaje i autobusy miasta Szczecina. In the 1950s its name have been changed into Miejskie Przedsiębiorstwo Komunikacyjne. That company managed 113 trams and 123 trailers. The bus stock have been fully destroyed. In 1945, Szczecin worked 23 motorman (mainly from Poznań), and at the end of the same year there were already 560 motorman. In 1946 4 lines were opened, which had a total length of route 16.7 km. On 4 April 1947, the first postwar bus line had been opened. Tram lines in 1946:

- 1 Wojska Polskiego – Brama Portowa
- 3 Las Arkoński – Dworzec Główny
- 4 Matejki – pl. Kościuszki
- 6 Gocław – Lubeckiego
- 7 Hutnicza – Mickiewicza

Tram lines in 1948:

- 1 Zajezdnia Pogodno – Wojska Polskiego – Brama Portowa
- 2 Kołłątaja – Dworzec Niebuszewo
- 3 Pomorzany – Las Arkoński
- 4 Powstańców Wlkp. –Dworzec Główny
- 5 Lubeckiego – Ku Słońcu
- 6 Gocław – Lubeckiego
- 7 Żołnierska – Jana z Kolna

=== 1956–1989 ===
Logo of ZDiTM Szczecin

In 1956, 9 tram lines were working. Routes of lines 1, 5, 7 and 9 led through tram tracks in Wojska Polskiego avenue (from Zwycięstwa square to Szarych Szeregów square), Obrońców Stalingradu Street and through the Old Town. On 7 December 1967, at about 6:35 o'clock, a tram accident in Wyszaka Street took the lives of 15 people.

Tram lines in 1964:

- 1 Głębokie – Wojska Polskiego – Brama Portowa – Potulicka
- 2 Dworzec Niebuszewo – Wyzwolenia – Brama Portowa – Wyszyńskiego – Gdańska – Basen Kaszubski
- 3 Pomorzany – Las Arkoński
- 4 Pomorzany – pl. Kościuszki – Piłsudskiego – Brama Portowa – Dworzec Główny
- 5 Krzekowo – Mickiewicza – Jagiellońska – Obrońców Stalingradu – Matejki – Stocznia Szczecińska – Stocznia Remontowa
- 6 Gocław – Dworcowa
- 7 Krzekowo – Mickiewicza – Jagiellońska – Obrońców Stalingradu – Wyszaka – Stocznia Szczecińska
- 8 Gumieńce – Brama Portowa – Gdańska – Basen Kaszubski
- 9 Zajezdnia Pogodno – Wojska Polskiego – Potulicka

On 1 December 1973, as a result of tendency to close tram lines in the centre of cities, tram transport was abolished in Wojska Polskiego avenue (from former Lenin square – current Szarych Szeregów to Zwycięstwa square), Obrońców Stalingradu Street and Jagiellońska Street (from Wojska Polskiego avenue to Piastów avenue). Apart from closing tracks, one had been opened in Bohaterów Warszawy avenue (from Jagiellońska Street) and Krzywoustego Street (to Kościuszki square). In 1976, MPK was transformed into Wojewódzkie Przedsiębiorstwo Komunikacji Miejskiej, which also managed public transport in other cities of Szczecin Voivodeship. In 1983, modernisation of tram depot Pogodno was finished.

Tram lines in 1988:

- 1 Głębokie – Stocznia Szczecińska
- 2 Dworzec Niebuszewo – Basen Górniczy
- 3 Las Arkoński – Pomorzany
- 4 Pomorzany – Potulicka
- 5 Krzekowo – Ludowa
- 6 Gocław – Pomorzany
- 7 Krzekowo – Basen Górniczy
- 8 Gumieńce – Basen Górniczy
- 9 Głębokie – Potulicka
- 10 Gocław – Potulicka
- 11 Ludowa – Pomorzany
- 12 Dworzec Niebuszewo – Pomorzany
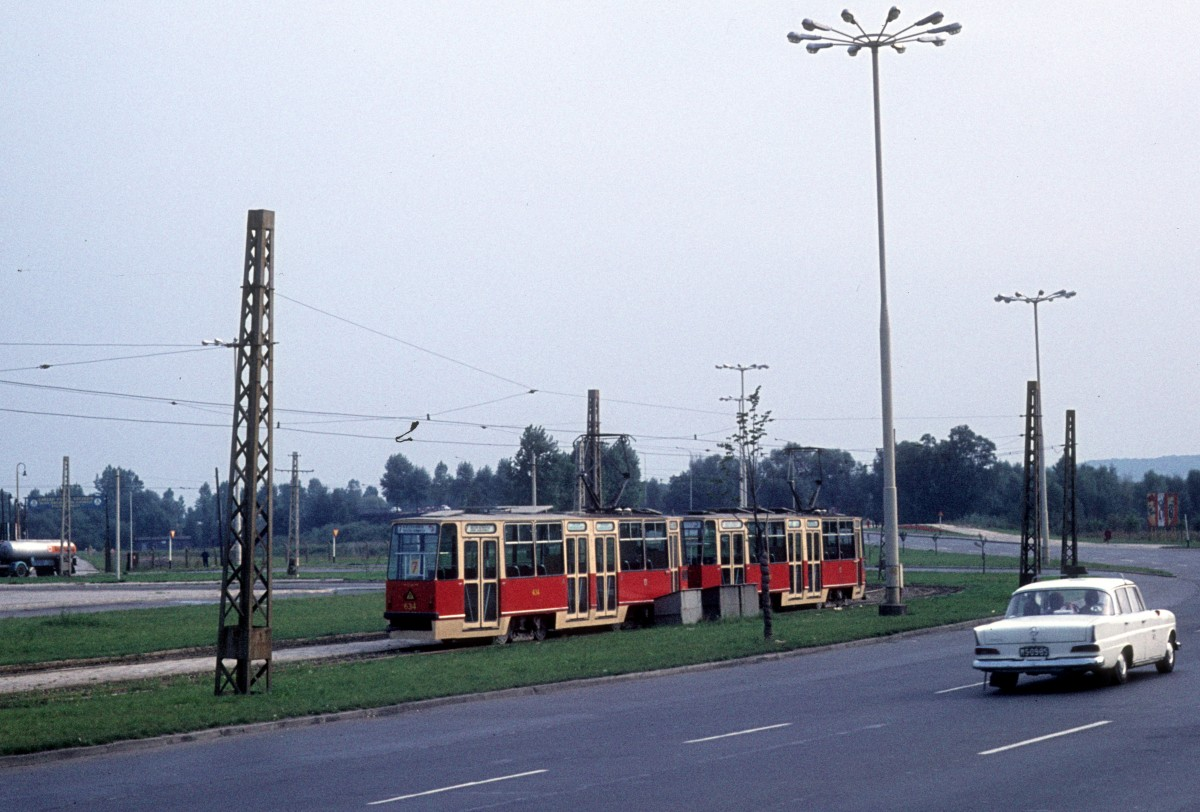
Trams Konstal 105N on balloon loop Basen Górniczy in 1975

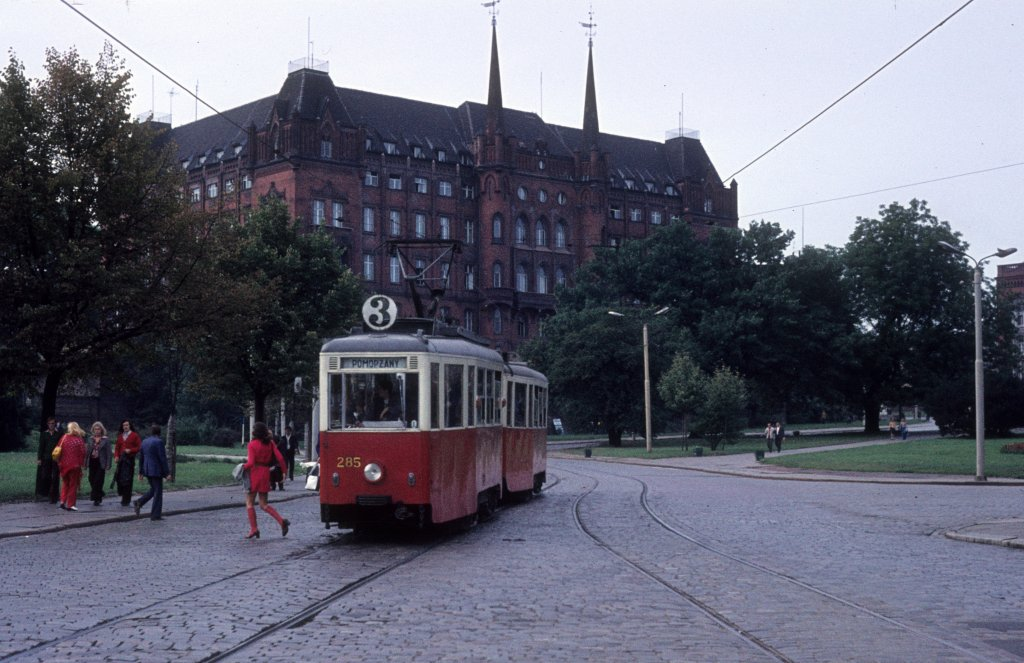
Trams Konstal N on route 3 in 1975

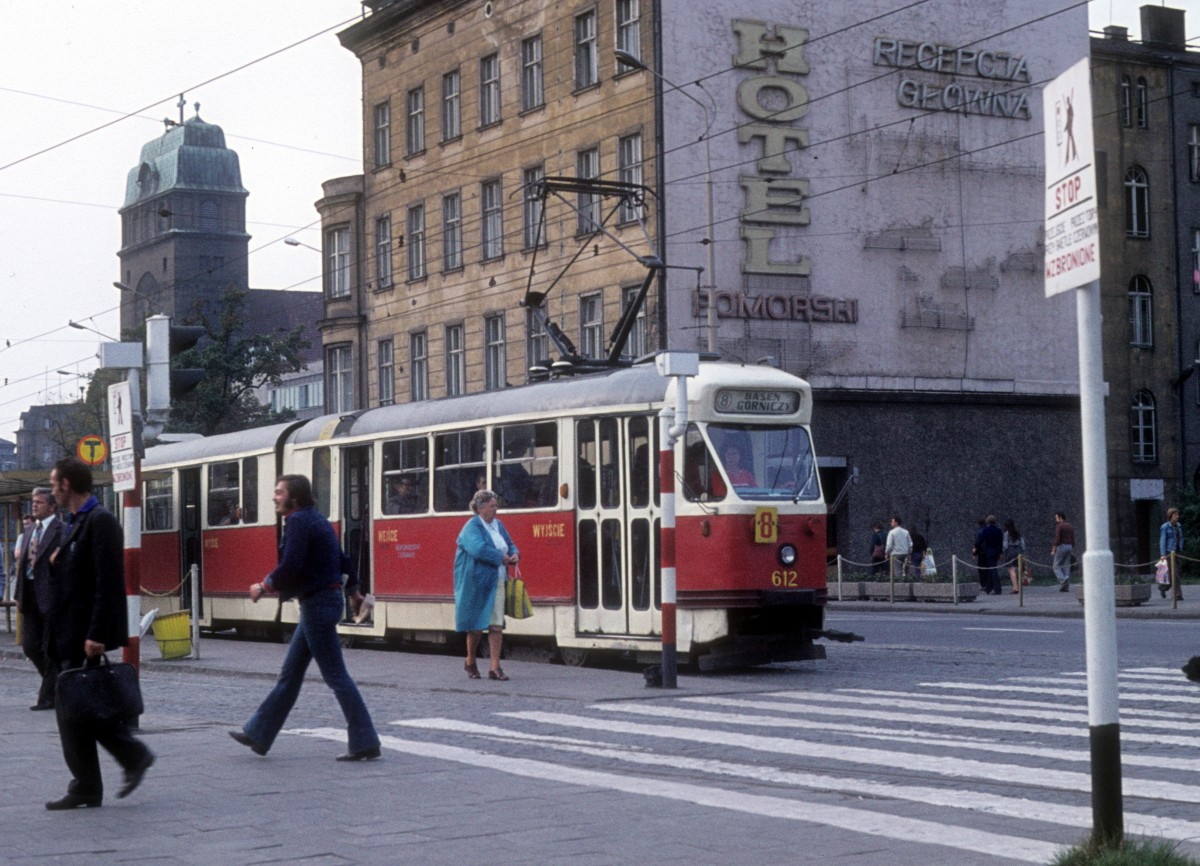
Konstal 102Na, line 8 at Brama Portowa square in 1975

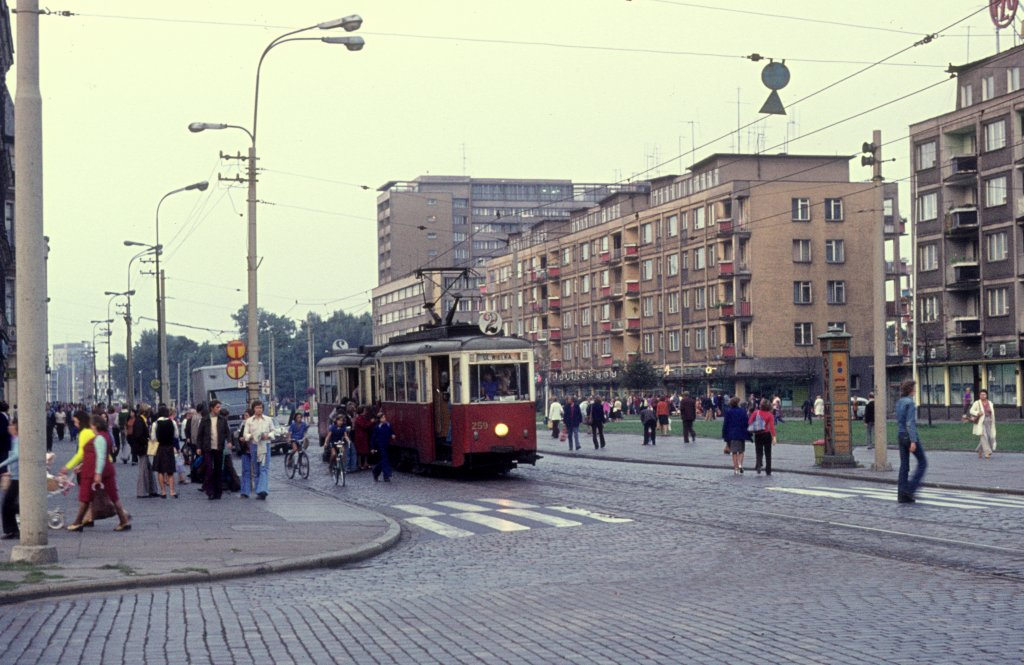
Trams in Wyzwolenia avenue in 1975

=== After 2009 ===
On 1 January 2009, Miejski Zakład Komunikacyjny (operator of trams in Szczecin) was transformed into the new company Tramwaje Szczecińskie sp. z o.o. On 1 February 2011, PESA 120NaS "Swing" – first low-floor tram in Szczecin, began operation. On 26 March 2011, started modernisation of tram tracks in Krasińskiego Street, Niemierzyńska Street and Arkońska Street. On 1 March 2012, ticket fares were changed. Current time limits are: 15, 30, 60 and 120 minutes. From April to August, during repairs of Brama Portowa square, old tram tracks had been replaced into modern ones. After 20 years of being abolished, on 3 September 2012, no. 10 tram line was launched on new route Gumieńce-Plac Rodła. On 14 April 2014, repairs of tram tracks were finished in Piastów avenue, at the same time began repairs of run-down tram track in Potulicka Street and Narutowicza Street. Repair includes replacing old track and pavements for new. The Balloon loop "Potulicka" was also said to have been renovated. In autumn 2014, repairs of tram tracks in 3 Maja avenue had begun.

On 29 August 2015, the first stage of a new, grade-separated extension called Szczecin Fast Tram (pl:Szczeciński Szybki Tramwaj) opened, extending the Szczecin tram beyond the right bank of the East Oder and the Port of Szczecin to the southeastern neighbourhood of Osiedle Słoneczne via Szczecin-Dąbie Airstrip and its associated request stop. The route is planned to extend into Bukowe-Klęskowo neighbourhood in the near future.

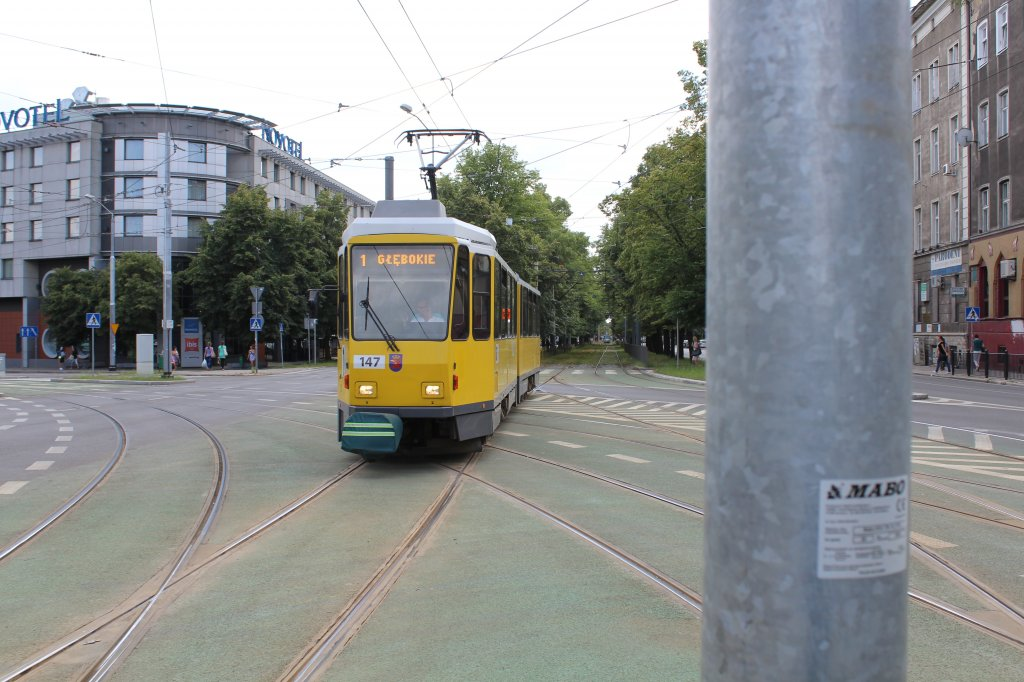
Tatra KT4Dt in 3 Maja avenue, 2013

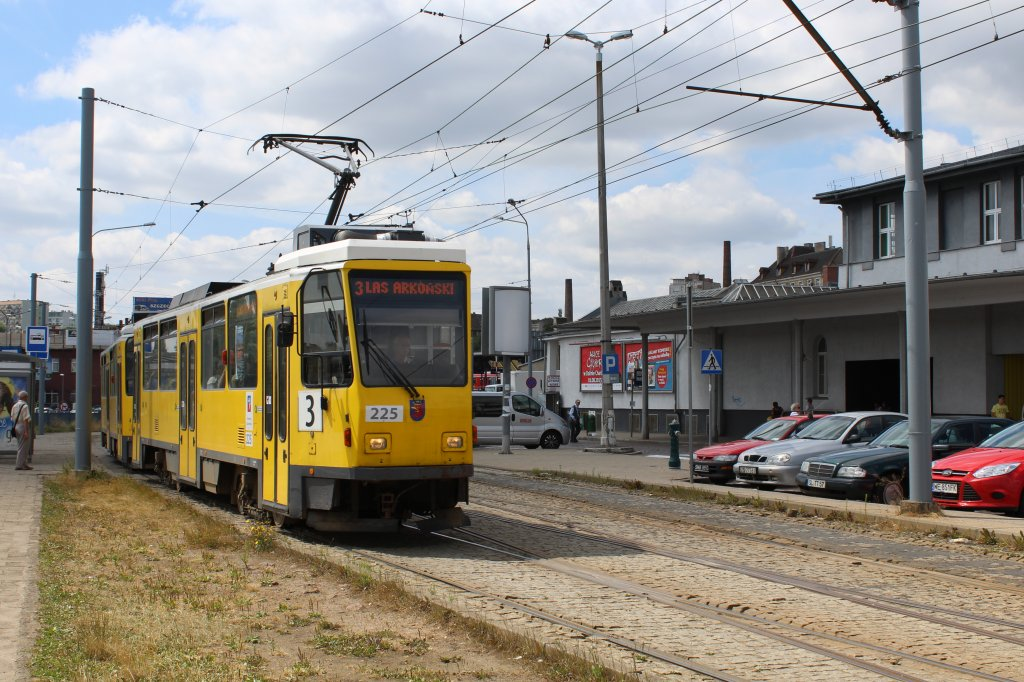
Tatra T6A2D in front of main railway station Szczecin Główny

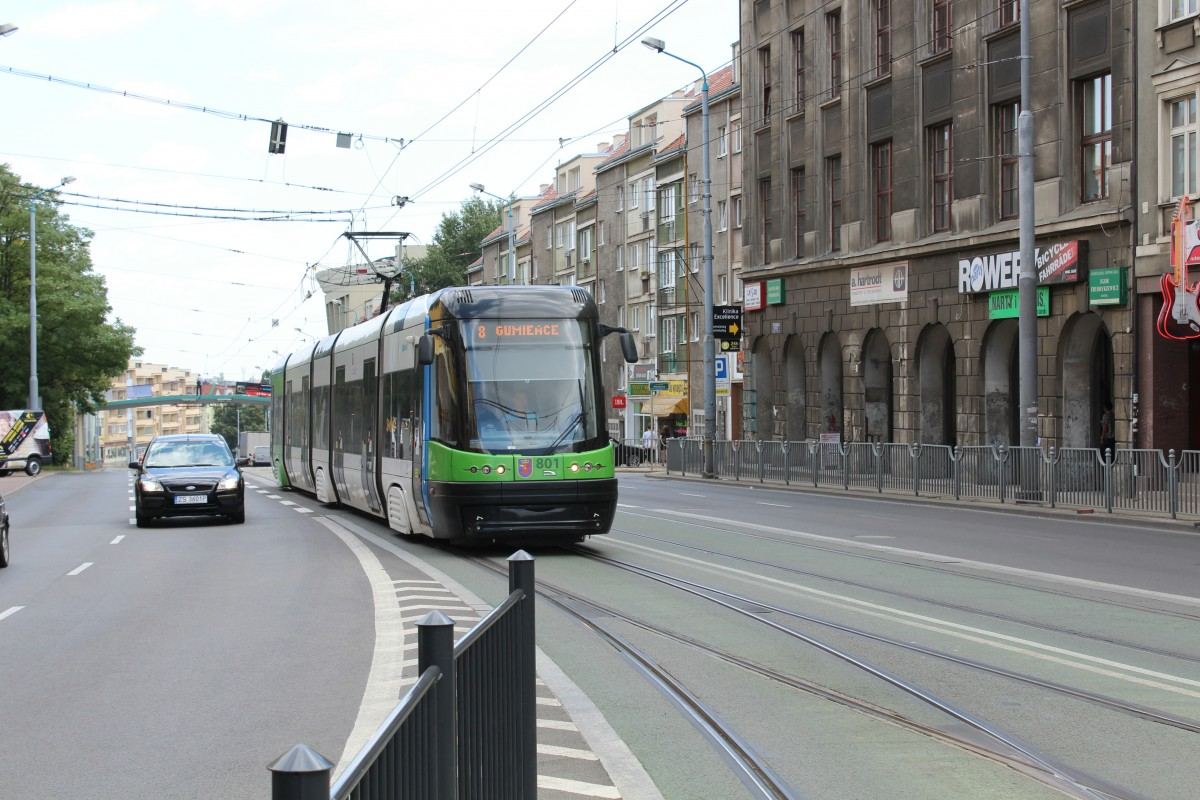
Low-floor PESA 120Na on line 8 in Wyszyńskiego Street

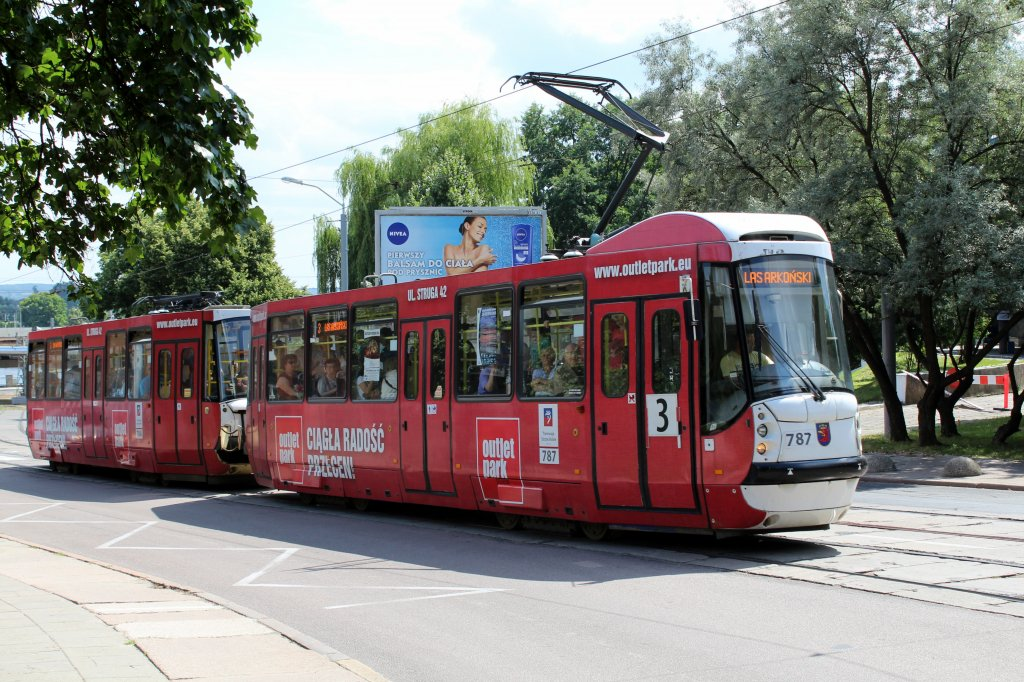
Konstal 105N2k/2000 trams on Tobrucki square

== Tram depots ==
=== Current ===
- Golęcin (19 Wiszesława Street)

It was built in 1898. It replaced earlier horse tram depot. The depot was renovated in 1926, 1979 and 1992. The first tram Konstal 105N reached the depot in June 1991. Since May 2001, the depotalso stored trams 105N2k/2000. Since 2008, the depot owns trams Tatra T6A2D, which have been bought from Berlin. Today, Golęcin operates lines 5, 6, 11 and 12.

- Pogodno (200 Wojska Polskiego avenue)

It is the largest and youngest tram depot. It was built in 1934 and expanded in 1981. All newly bought trams were sent here to 1991. Since the 1990s, The depot stores Konstal 105N trams and their newer version, 105N2k/2000. The depot also stores low-floor PESA 120Na and 120NaS2 trams. Except for these trams, Pogodno also former Berlin trams Tatra T6A2 and Tatra KT4Dt. Nowadays, depot operates lines 1, 2, 3, 4, 5, 7, 8, 9, 10 and 12. The depot is currently being renovated.

=== Former ===
- Niemierzyn (18A Niemierzyńska Street) – closed on 1 October 2004 – since 2004 in the depot has been located in Museum of Technic and Transport "Depot of Art"
- Depot in Krzysztofa Kolumba Street (today shops and warehouses).
- Depot in Piotra Skargi Street (today Municipal Department of Waste Management and a bicycle shop).
- Horse tram depot in Dębogórska Street (demolished)
- Horse tram depot in Dubois Street (demolished)
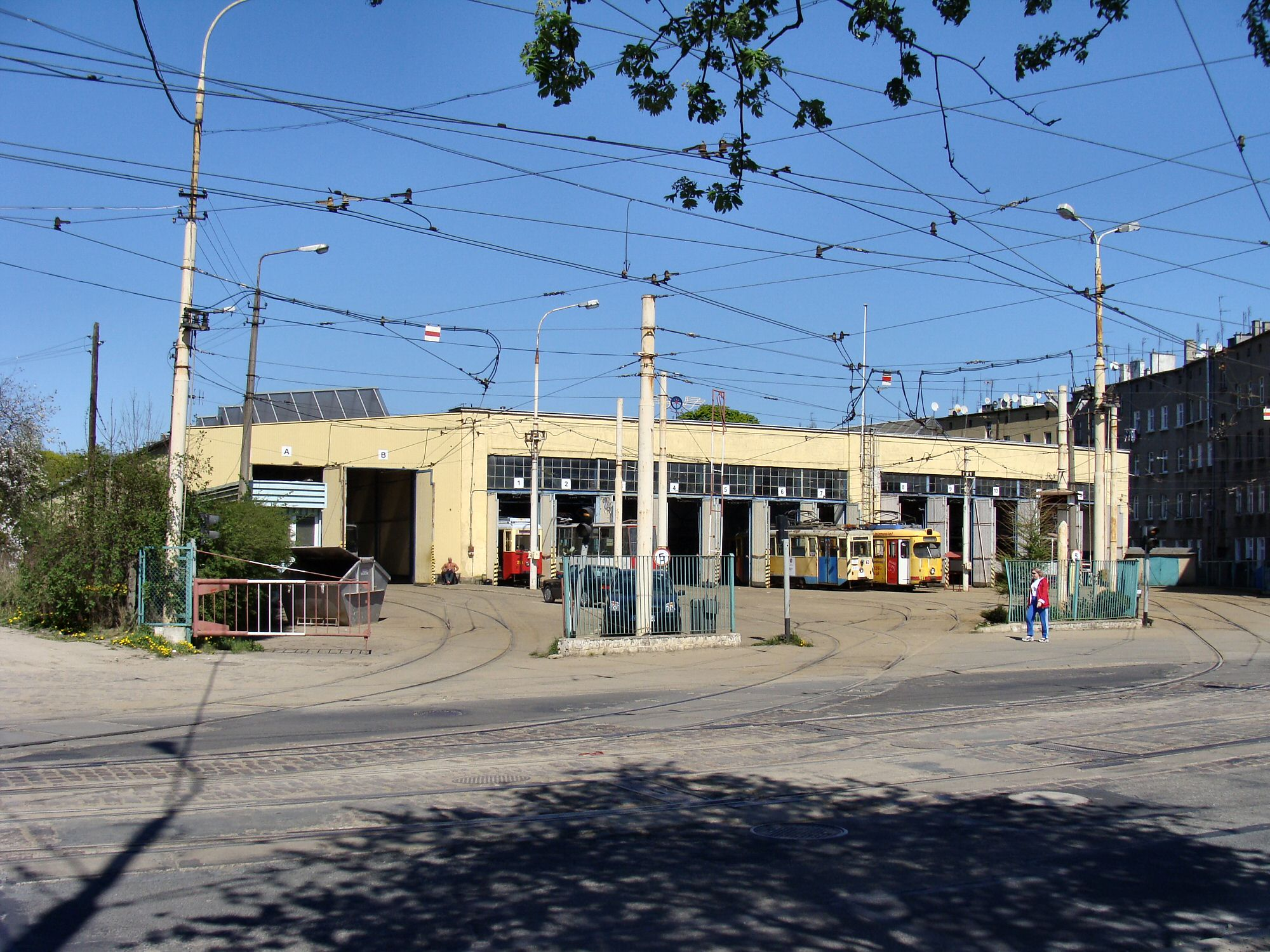
Golęcin tram depot

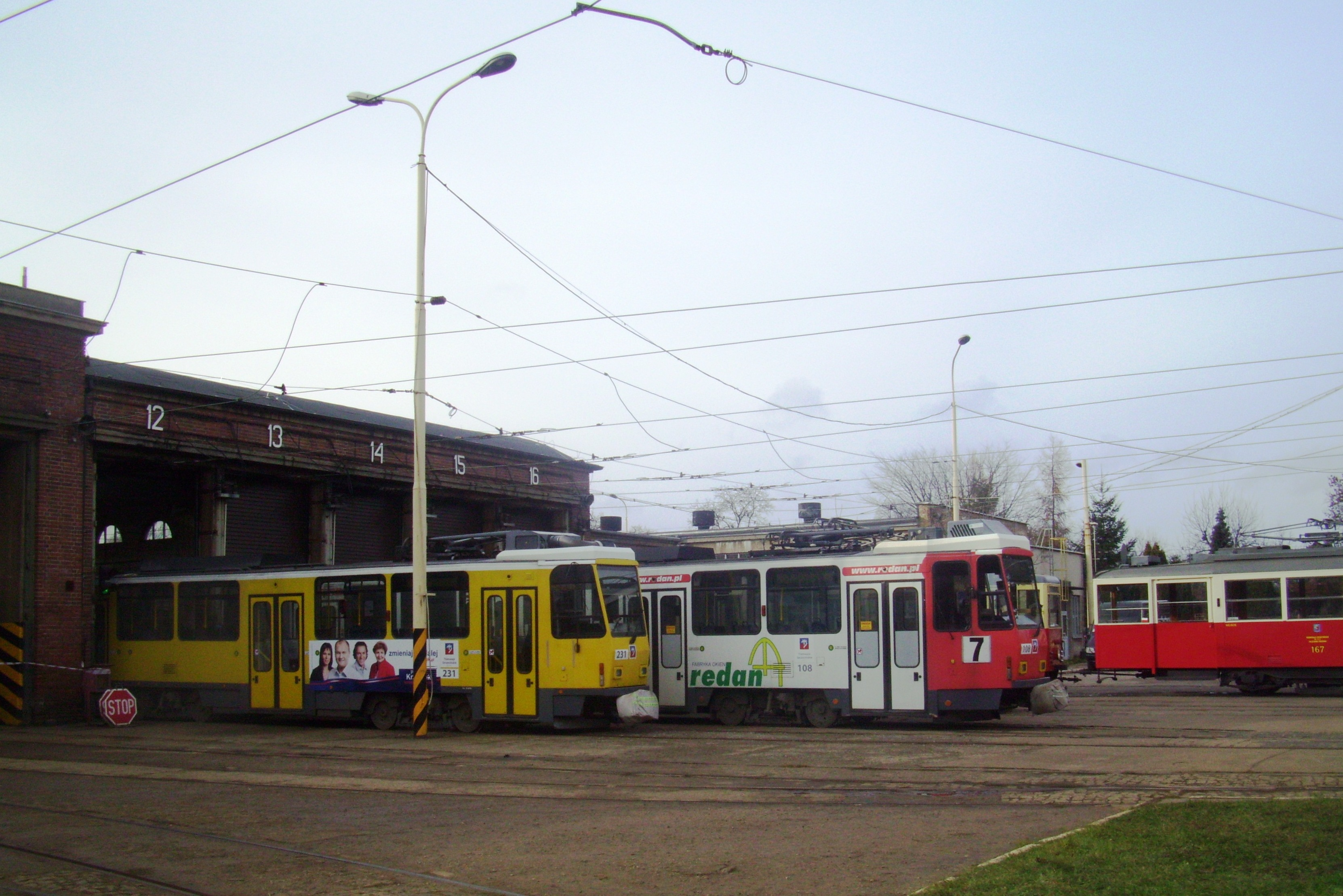
Pogodno tram depot

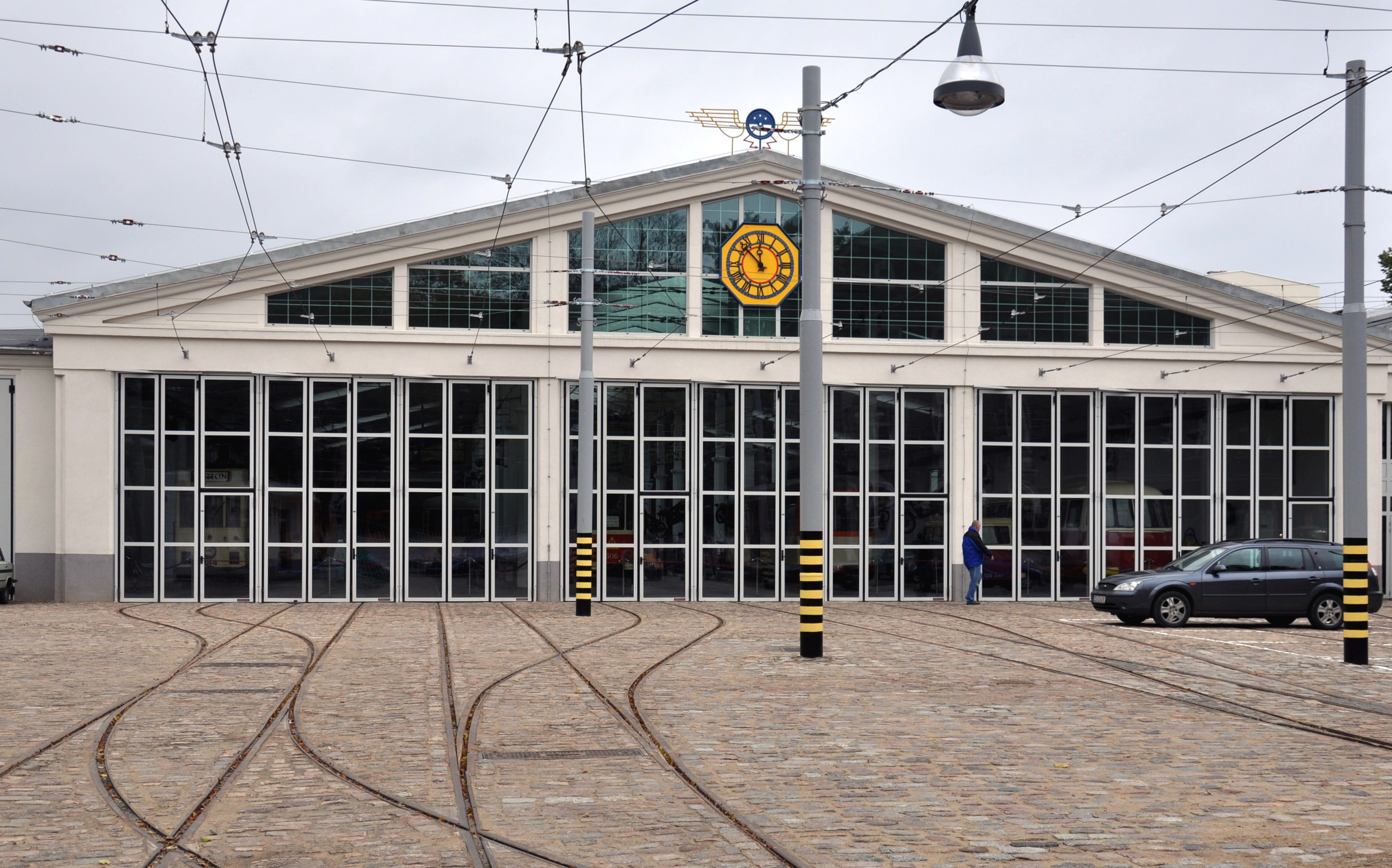
Former Niemierzyn tram depot – nowadays museum

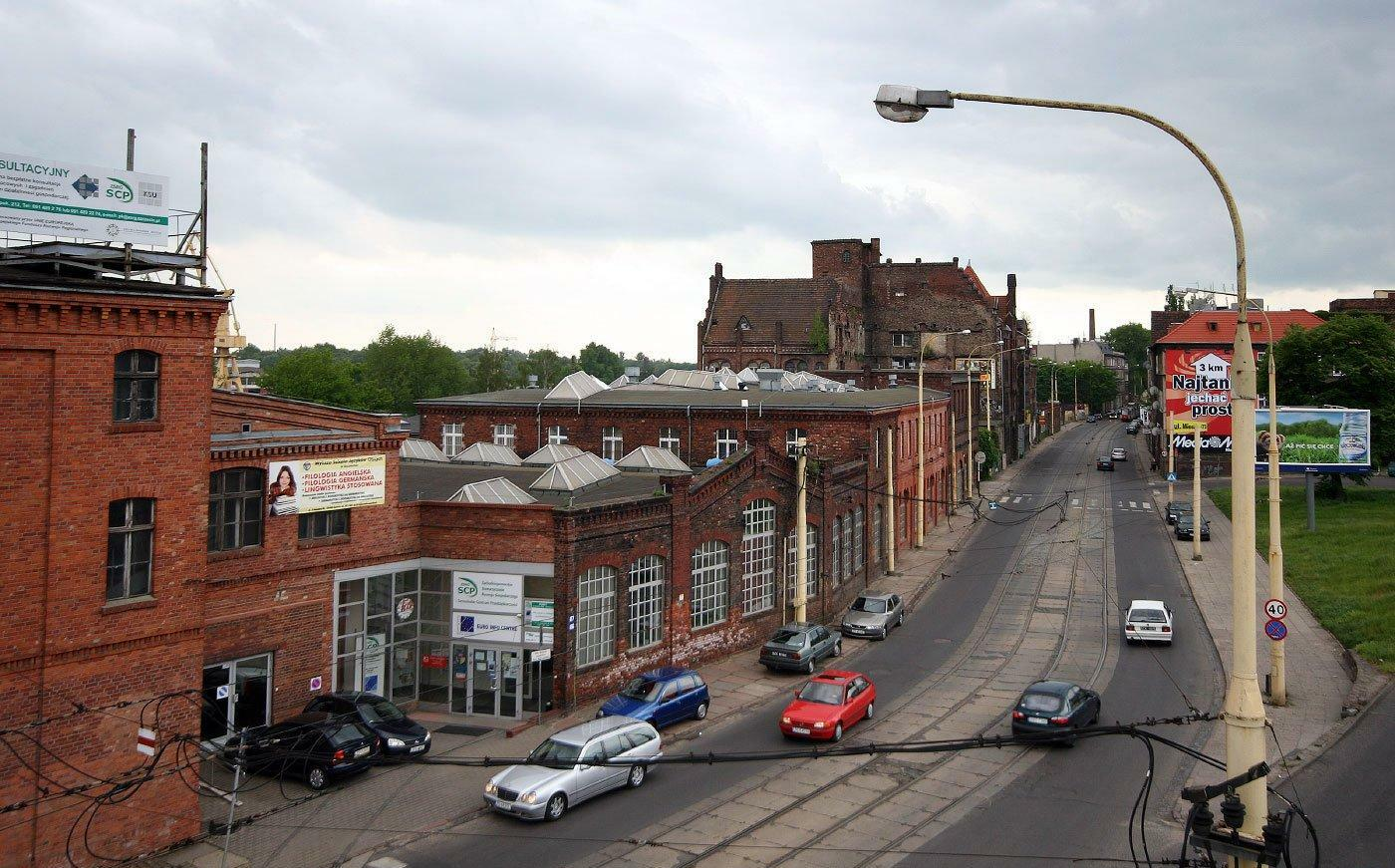
Former depot in Krzystofa Kolumba Street

== Tram lines ==
=== Normal lines ===
Tram #	Route	Length	Travel time	Stops
	Osiedle Zawadzkiego ↔ Potulicka	9.4 km	32 min	17-20
	Dworzec Niebuszewo ↔ Turkusowa	11.5 km	31 min	17-18
	Osiedle Zawadzkiego ↔ Pomorzany	8.7 km	37 min	22
	Line currently suspended due to low daily passenger count	N/A	N/A	N/A
	Osiedle Zawadzkiego ↔ Stocznia Szczecińska	7.6 km	33 min	20-21
	Gocław ↔ Pomorzany	10.9 km	35-36 min	23-24
	Osiedle Zawadzkiego ↔ Turkusowa	10 km	42 min	24
	Gumieńce ↔ Turkusowa	13.03 km	34-44 min (depending on schedule)	19
	Głębokie ↔ Potulicka	8.9 km	32-35 min	18
	Głębokie/Las Arkoński/Plac Rodła ↔ Gumieńce	9.5 km	18 min (Plac Rodła) 33 min (Las Arkoński) 39 min (Głębokie)	13-24-31
	Ludowa ↔ Pomorzany	9.1 km	35 min	20
	Dworzec Niebuszewo ↔ Pomorzany	6.9 km	29 min	18

Low-floor rolling stock can be found on all lines. Lines 2, 7 and 8 additionally run along the Szczecin Fast Tram extension.

== Rolling stock ==
=== Modern cars ===
Image	Tram type	In use since	Number of cars
	Konstal 105Ng/2015 (modernised 105Na)	2015	12
	Konstal 105N2k/2000/S	2001	14
	Protram 105N2k/2000/D	2007	6
	Tatra KT4DtM	2006	73
	Tatra T6A2D	2008	48
	Moderus Alfa HF09 (modernised 105Na)	2008	2
	Moderus Alfa HF10AC (modernised 105Na)	2011	12
	PESA 120NaS	2011	6
	PESA 120NaS2	2013	22
	Moderus Beta MF 15/25 AC	2014/2018	6
	Moderus Beta MF 29 AC BD	2020–2023	6

Moderus Gamma 2026

=== Historical cars ===
Tram type	Years of production	Number of cars
Nordwaggon Bremen	1926	1
Düwag GT6	1958	1
Düwag B4	1957–1960	2
Konstal N	1954	1
Konstal 4N	1956–1962	2
Konstal 4ND	1958	1
Konstal 102Na	1971–73	3

== Loops ==
Image	Name	In operation since	Tram lines
	Basen Górniczy	1973	Not used
	Dworzec Niebuszewo	1927	
	Głębokie	1955	
	Gocław	1975	
	Gumieńce	1955	
	Krzekowo	1954	Was destroyed in 2023
	Las Arkoński	1959	
	Ludowa	1964–1965	
	Pomorzany	1961	
	Potulicka	1969	
	Stocznia Szczecińska	?	
	Turkusowa	2015	
	Osiedle Zawadzkiego	2021	
