= Tatra T5 =

Tatra T5 is the overall typename of trams in the fifth generation, manufactured by ČKD Tatra. This generation has brand new concept, is not based on PCC streetcar, like previous generations.

- T5A5, a prototype which shortly went in service
- T5B6, another prototype which didn't go into service.
- T5C5, 322 units produced 1978 - 1984 and sold to Budapest
