= Tatra K1 =

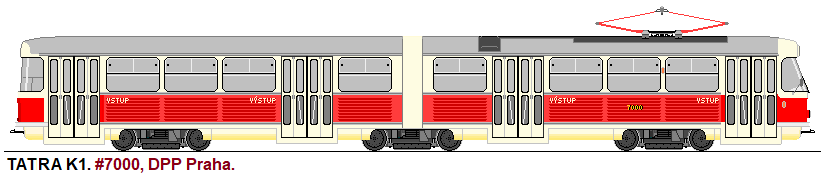
- Manufacturer: ČKD Tatra, Tatra-Yug
- Assembly: (Czechoslovakia) Prague
- Family name: Tatra
- Constructed: 1964–1965
- Number built: 2
- Capacity: 157

Specifications
- Car length: 20,260 mm (66 ft 6 in)
- Width: 2,500 mm (8 ft 2 in)
- Height: 3,050 mm (10 ft 0 in)
- Doors: 2 / 4
- Engine type: TE 022
- Traction motors: 4
- Power output: 4×40 kW
- Electric system(s): 600 V DC
- Current collector(s): pantograph
- Wheels driven: 4
- Bogies: 3
- Coupling system: Prague-type couppling
- Track gauge: 1,435 mm (4 ft 8 1/2 in)

The Tatra K1 was an experimental tramcar developed by ČKD Tatra between 1964 and 1965.

== History ==
Previous Tatra units were concerned primarily with increasing capacity in a single tramcar. Tatra sought to correct this shortcoming by developing its first articulated tramcar, the K1. The K1 was largely based on the established T3, although certain electrical aspects were adjusted for the K1. In 1965, two prototypes were built with numbers 7000 and 801 (the second prototype never had the number 7001) with electro-pneumatic equipment UA 11. The second one was shipped to Ostrava. After a short trial in Prague with the prototype 7000, it entered Ostrava service with 800. They remained there for three years until October 1, 1968, before it was returned to the manufacturer. The test runs exposed problems with the electronic equipment. Thus, the two prototypes were the only ones ever produced.

The first prototype underwent reconstruction to functional sample KTX (later KT4) with a shortened body, in 1969. This sample was subjected to the test drives. It was sent in 1971 into Liberec on meter gauge. From Liberec, it was sent back in the winter of 1972/73. After this prototype was renumbered to 8004, it took on new thyristor electric equipment TV 2. After several test runs, it was retired and used as a warehouse in a Prague depot called Hloubětín. The second prototype was never put into operation again. Instead it was used as a warehouse in ČKD Tatra until the second half of the 1970's when both prototypes were scrapped.

== Production ==
Country	City	Type	Delivery years	Number	Fleet numbers
Czechoslovakia	Ostrava	K1	1965	2	800, 801
Total:				2	

Note: This is the list of first owners. Stock may have later been resold to other cities, not on this list.
