= Tatra T5A5 =

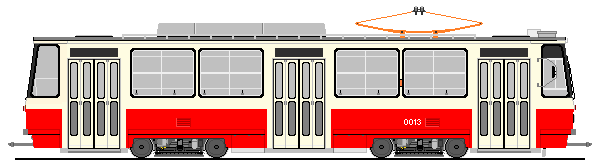
- Sketch of Tatra T5A5
- Manufacturer: ČKD Tatra
- Assembly: (Czechoslovakia) Prague
- Family name: Tatra
- Constructed: 1981
- Number built: 1
- Capacity: 135

Specifications
- Car length: 14,300 mm (46 ft 11 in)
- Width: 2,500 mm (8 ft 2 in)
- Height: 3,145 mm (10 ft 3.8 in)
- Doors: 3
- Maximum speed: 65 km/h (40 mph)
- Engine type: TE 022H
- Traction motors: 4
- Power output: 4×40 kW
- Electric system(s): 600 V DC
- Current collector(s): pantograph
- Wheels driven: 4
- Coupling system: Albert
- Track gauge: 1,435 mm (4 ft 8 1/2 in)

The Tatra T5A5 was an experimental tramcar developed in 1972 by ČKD Tatra in Prague.

== History ==
Designed as a successor to earlier models, the T5A5 was fitted with similar electrical equipment to its predecessors, but was fitted with an improved motor. The prototype entered service in 1974 on a trial run in Prague and was withdrawn two years later. Its electrical equipment was used in the design of the B6A2 for East Germany, and the vehicle was eventually scrapped in 1985.

Having realised that the original prototype could not be put into general production, a second example emerged in 1981 and was once again tested exclusively in Prague. Its trial period did not last long, and, as with the first example, it never remained in active service.
