= Rudolf Auspitz =

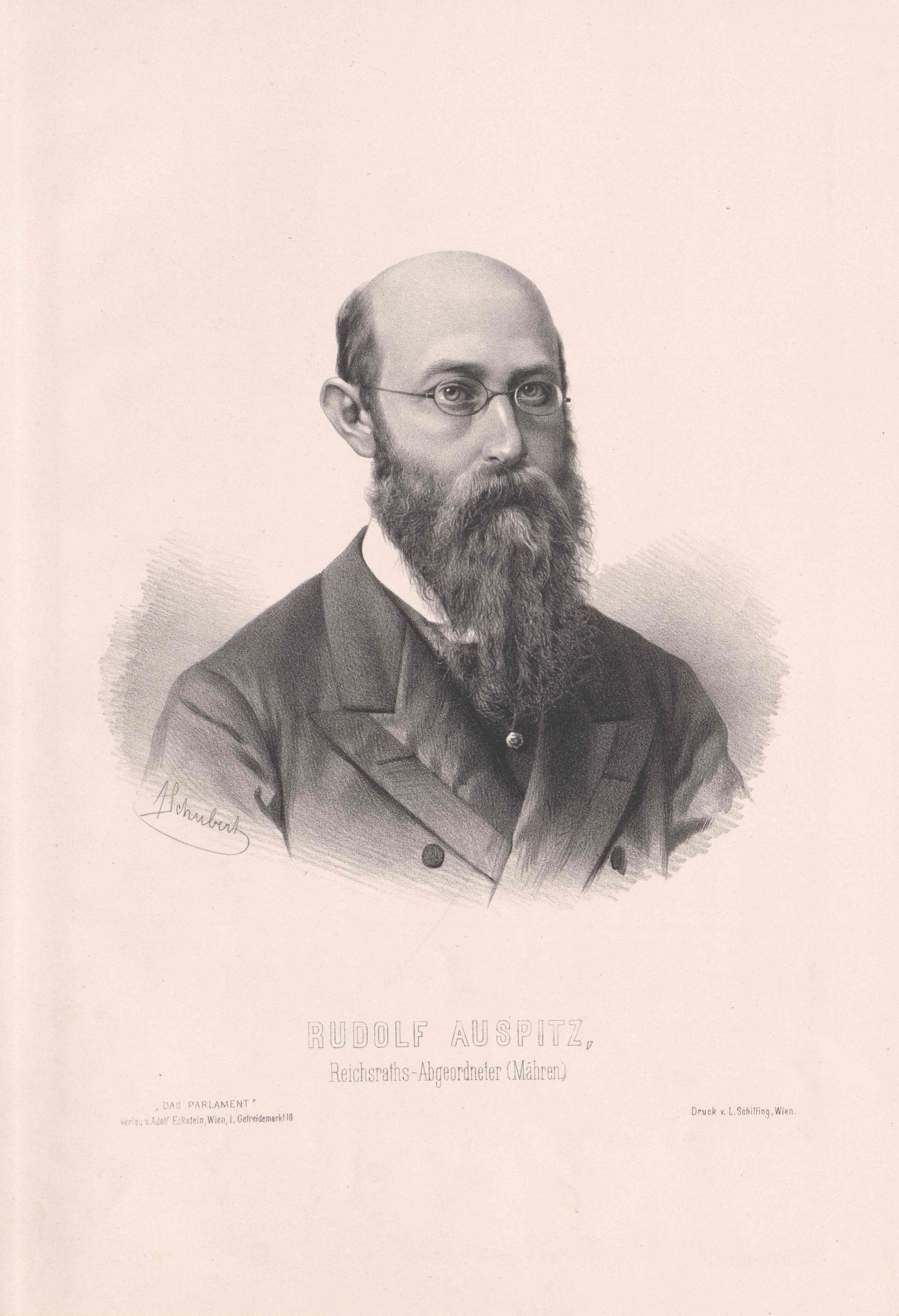
Auspitz's portrait

Rudolf Auspitz (7 July 1837, Vienna – 10 March 1906, Vienna) was an Austrian industrialist, economist, politician and banker. He was the father of artist Josefine Winter (1873–1943)

In 1874, together with his cousins, the siblings Leopold, Adolf, Richard, Ida and Helene Lieben, Auspitz purchased the property Universitätsring 4 / Löwelbastei 22 / Oppoltzergasse 6, built by the Wiener Baugesellschaft,
