= Josefine Winter =

Austrian Jewish painter, composer, and writer murdered in the Holocaust (1873–1943)

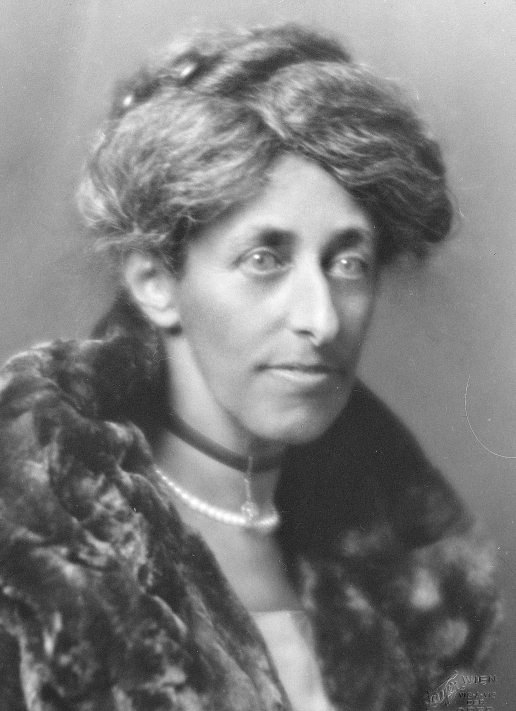
Photo by Georg Fayer (1927)

Josefine Winter (since 1914 Winter Edle von Wigmar; born 21 December 1873 in Vienna; died 20 January 1943 in the Theresienstadt ghetto) was an Austrian painter, composer and writer.

== Life ==
Josefine, or Josephine, was born in Vienna, the daughter of Rudolf Auspitz (1837-1906) and Helene Lieben (1838-1896). In 1879, her mother fell ill with depression and was put in the Préfargier psychiatric hospital near Neuchâtel. The children were placed in the care of a governess, Marie Heidenhain from Dresden, who became the father's new wife after the mother's death in 1896

Josefine was educated by private tutors, but as a girl was not allowed to study. Like her mother, she began to paint. Her teachers were Emanuel Stöckler and Ludwig Michalek. Although both parents were patrons of the Gesellschaft der Musikfreunde in Vienna, they did not notice her musical talent. She received only the piano lessons customary at the time for children from "good homes." Through visits to performances of the Vienna Court Opera, Josefine became enthusiastic about Georges Bizet's Carmen and began to play the melodies she heard on the piano. The pianist Lili Michalek became her first teacher before she became a student of Josef Bohuslav Foerster at the New Vienna Conservatory.

In 1894, she married Alfred Fröhlich von Feldau (died 6 April 1913) and had two children, Hilde (born 26 December 1895) and Walter (born 22 September 1897; died 21 September 1960). Her name changed to Josefine Fröhlich Rosa Edle von Feldau. She divorced her first husband and married the Viennese doctor and poet Josef Winter (born 2 February 1857 in Vienna; died 6 July 1916 in Vienna). With Winter, she had a daughter, Marianne von Nechansky-Winter (21 April 1902 - 24 August 1985), a painter, and a son, Gerhard (born 29 April 1903).

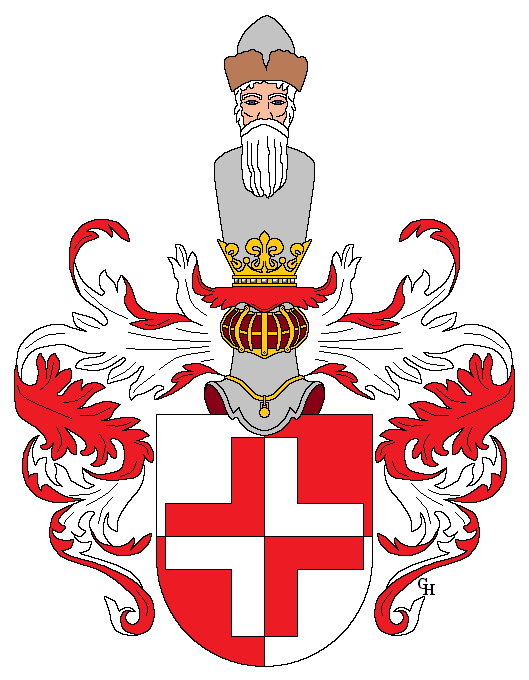
Winter von Wigmar coat of arms, 1914

Josefine took over the management of a children's care home during the First World War. Using her fortune, her husband founded, among other things, a lung sanatorium and mobile epidemic laboratories for the Red Cross, for which he was awarded the title "Edler von Wigmar" in 1914. Josephine became Josefine Rosa Winter Edle von Wigmar.

Her husband died from heart disease in July 1916.

== Nazi persecution ==
After the Anschluss of Austria in 1938, she was persecuted by the Nazis as a Jew. Due to the anti-Jewish Nuremberg Race Laws, Josefine Winter was expelled from her villa at Anastasius-Grün-Gasse 54 in the Cottage district of Währing to Vereinigte Textilwerke K. H. Barthel & Co, a company linked to the Gabersdorf labour camp, was forced into a "collective apartment" in the Second District at Springergasse 27 and lost all her rights. She tried to regain them with a personal letter to Adolf Hitler. Her assets were "Aryanized", that is, transferred to non-Jewish owners, and she was deported on Transport IV/4 to the Theresienstadt Ghetto on 15 July 1942, where she died on 20 January 1943. The Winter family's art collection included a large number of works by Rudolf von Alt and one of Rembrandt's works that was destined for the Führer Museum.

== Works ==
=== Compositions ===
She set to music texts by female poets of her time, such as Paula Preradović and Hilda Benjamin.

- Die Patrizier von Ragusa (Preradović)
- Spruch der Halme (Benjamin)
- Verlöbnis
- Lied in Moll
- Im Buchenwald (Winter)
- Seelenlied
- Das ist der Tag des Herrn
- Requiem (Conrad Ferdinand Meyer)
- Jetzt rede Du!

=== Autobiography ===
- Fünfzig Jahre eines Wiener Hauses. Wilhelm Braumüller, Wien/Leipzig 1927.

=== Paintings ===
Encyclopedias of Austrian painting of the 19th century reference her. She had an exhibition in 1923 and 1924 in the Vienna Künstlerhaus.
