= ČKD =

Defunct Czech company

Českomoravská Kolben-Daněk
- Industry: machine industry machinery industry and plant construction
- Founded: 1927
- Founder: Merging of two smaller companies
- Defunct: 2000
- Successor: Siemens Mobility
- Headquarters: Czech Republic
- Products: Trams, locomotives

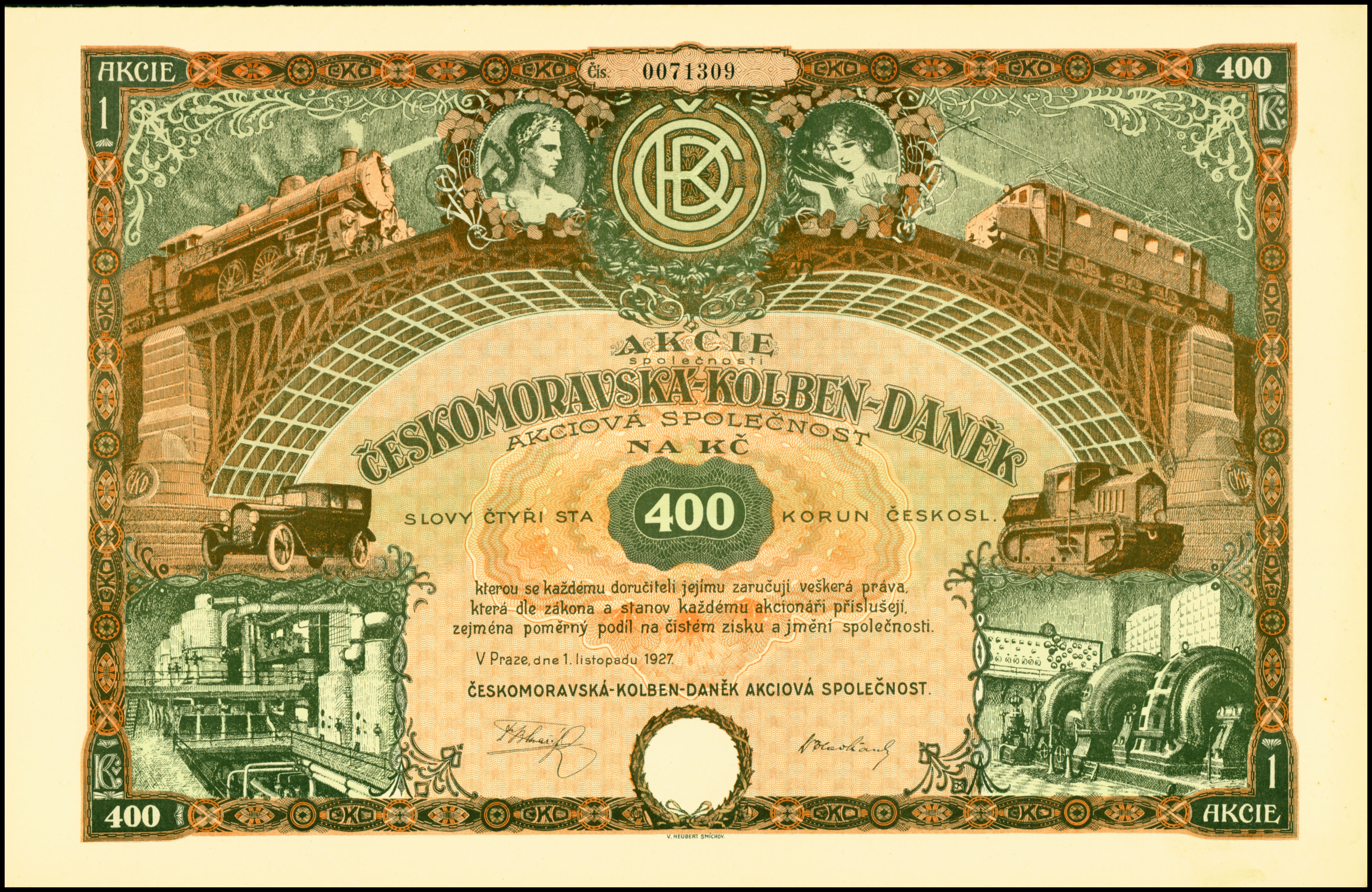
Share of the Českomoravská-Kolben-Daněk, issued 1. November 1927

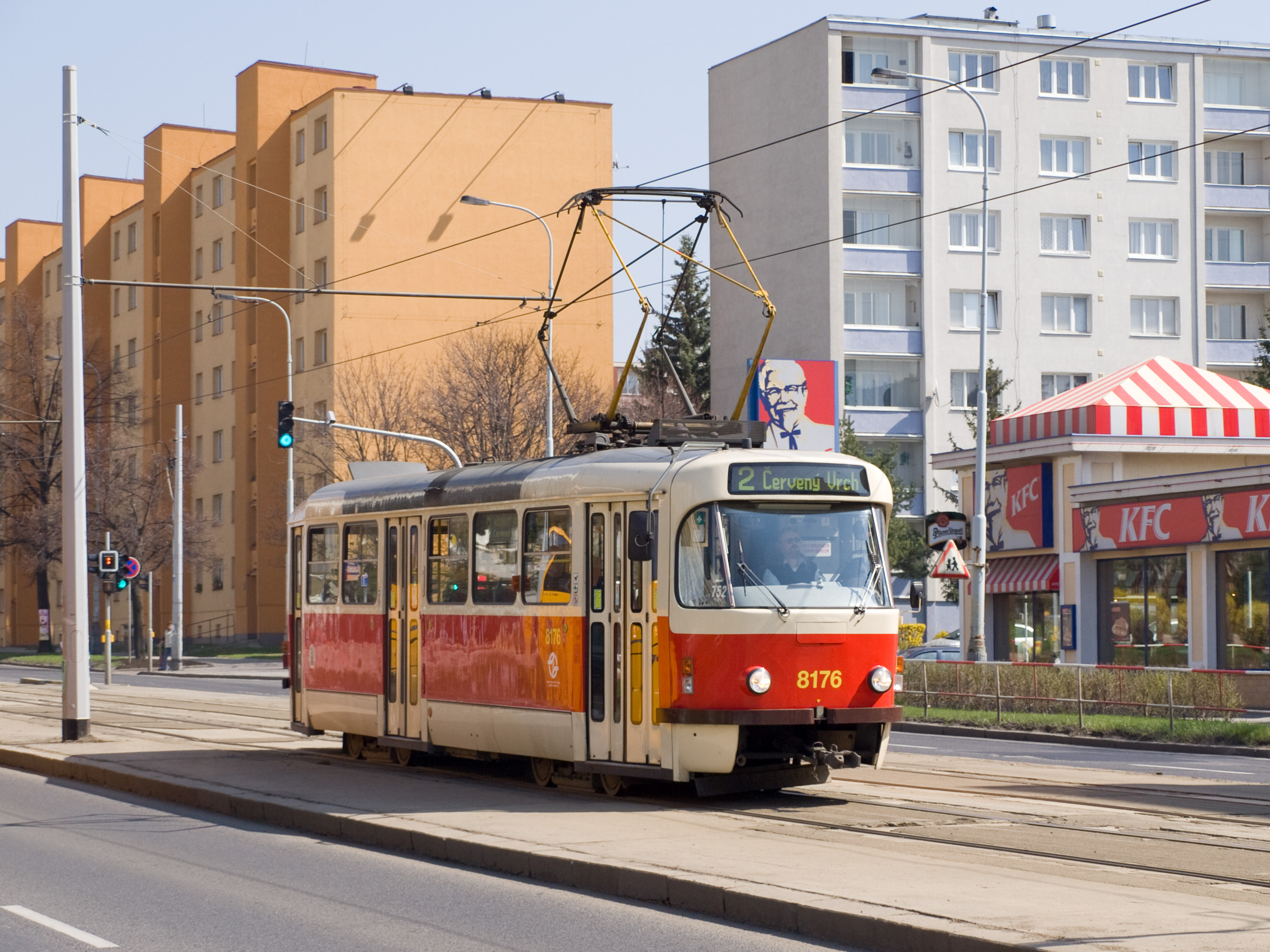
ČKD Tatra-T3 tram car in Prague. T3 was the most successful ČKD tram manufactured from 1960 to 1989; 13991 units were sold worldwide, as of 2015 they are still the most common trams in the world

ČKD (Českomoravská Kolben-Daněk; Czech pronunciation: [ˈtʃɛskomorafskaː ˈkolbɛn ˈdaɲɛk]) was one of the largest engineering companies in the former Czechoslovakia and today's Czech Republic. It is famous for the Tatra T3, a tramcar that sold 13,991 units worldwide.

== History ==
ČKD was formed in 1927 from the merger of two smaller companies, Českomoravská-Kolben (founded 1896, produced machinery for hydro dams) and Breitfeld-Daněk (founded 1854, produced machinery for mines and food industry).

From 1927 until 1929 ČKD's products included a motorcycle designed by Jaroslav František Koch. It was an advanced four-stroke single-cylinder unit construction with double overhead camshaft design of 500cc. It was sold under the marque BD, thus perpetuating the Breitfeld-Daněk identity. In 1929 ČKD sold its motorcycle business to Praga Hostivař, which re-branded the motorcycles under the Praga marque. It was one of the main suppliers to the Czechoslovak state of military vehicles during the 1930s.

During the German occupation of Czechoslovakia in World War II, the company was renamed BMM (Böhmisch-Mährische Maschinenfabrik AG) and manufactured arms for the Wehrmacht. The company's most notable products in this era were a light tank of the company's own design – the Panzer 38(t) – and the Jagdpanzer 38(t) tank destroyer, which was built on the Panzer 38(t)'s chassis.

After the war, ČKD was nationalized and became one of the world's leading producers of trams. These were produced, initially under license of the American Transit Research Corporation, by its subsidiary company, ČKD Tatra (commonly known as Tatra, when being referred to in connection with trams, but separate from the company Tatra). From the 1930s to the 1950s, ČKD also supplied electrical equipment for several trolleybuses built by Tatra, as well as ones built by Škoda until Škoda began manufacturing its own such equipment. ČKD Tatra also manufactured metro cars and diesel locomotives, that were exported to other communist countries. One such example from the T-series of Czech locomotives was exported into the USSR and given a Russian designation "ЧМЭ" (ChME3) there. In the socialist era ČKD employed up to 50,000 people.

After 1989 with worldwide economic and political changes the company lost many of its traditional trade outlets in Central and Eastern Europe, mainly in former countries of Soviet Union. In 1994 the company was privatized by the Czech government and transformed into a holding company. However, new management was unsuccessful and in 1998, ČKD holding was close to bankruptcy. Some companies went bankrupt, while others returned to state ownership through debts to state-owned bank IPB. The state sold some companies separately to new owners, most notably the 2001 sale of the transport company, ČKD Dopravní systémy (CKD Transportation Systems, known until 1997 as ČKD Tatra or simply Tatra), to Společnost kolejových vozidel (SKV), the Czech subsidiary of Germany's Siemens Mobility, finalized in February 2002.

== Products ==
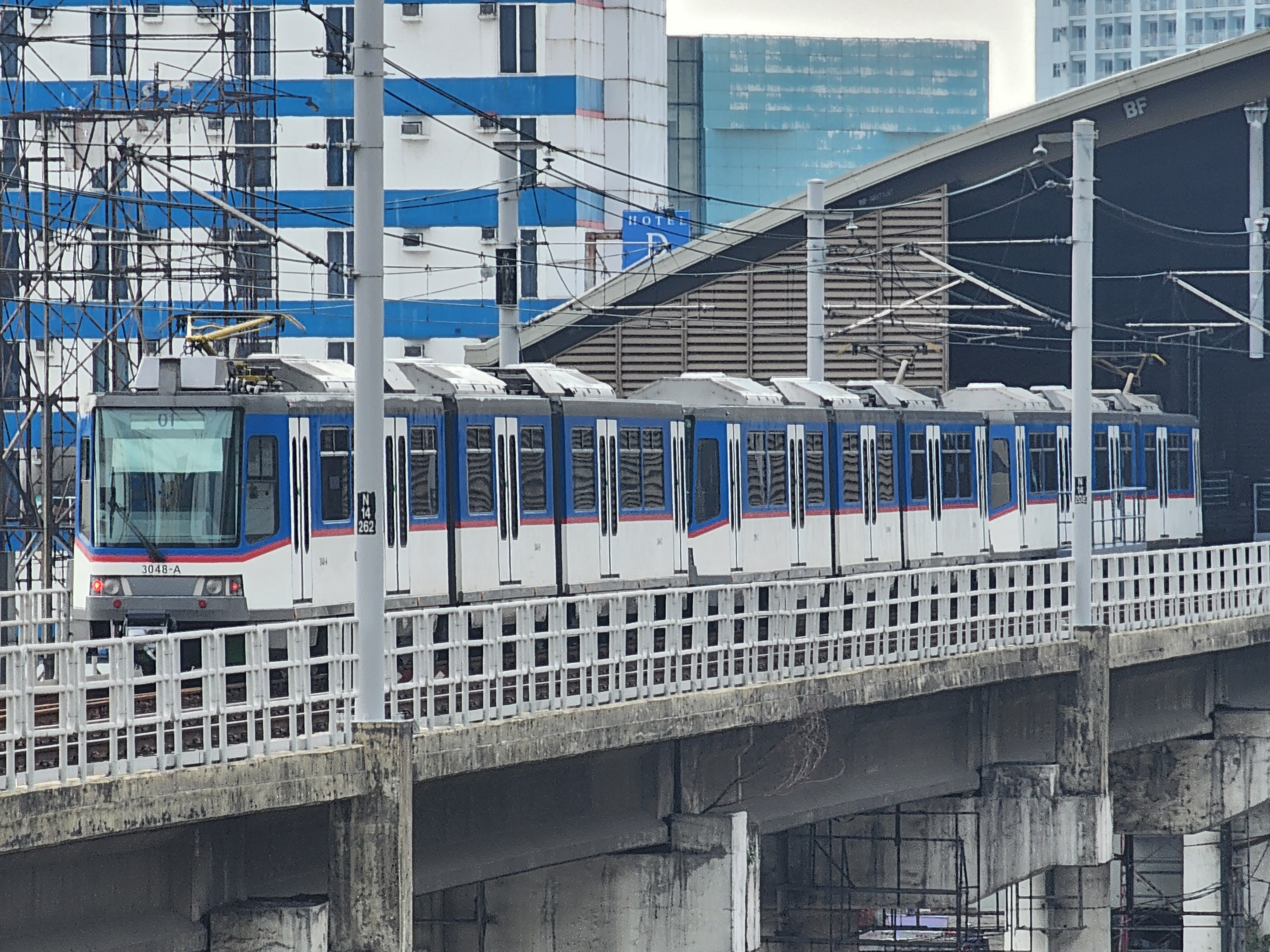
ČKD Tatra RT8D5 light rail vehicle in Manila. The RT8D5 is a high-floor light rail vehicle based on the KT8D5 tram. These were the last trains that ČKD produced before the company was sold to Siemens Mobility, and the only ones that ČKD built for high platform loading.

=== Trams ===
==== Standard trams (T) ====
- T1
- T2
- T3 (T3R, T3RF)
- T4
- T5 (T5A5, T5B6, T5C5)
- T6 (T6A2, T6A5, T6B5, T6C5)
- T7 (T7B5)

==== Articulated trams (KT, RT) ====
- K1
- K2
- K5
- KT4 (KTNF6)
- KT8D5 (KT8D5N)
- RT6 (RT6N1, RT6S)
- RT8D5

==== Trailers (B) ====
- B3
- B4
- B6A2

=== Metrocars ===
- R1

=== Locomotives ===
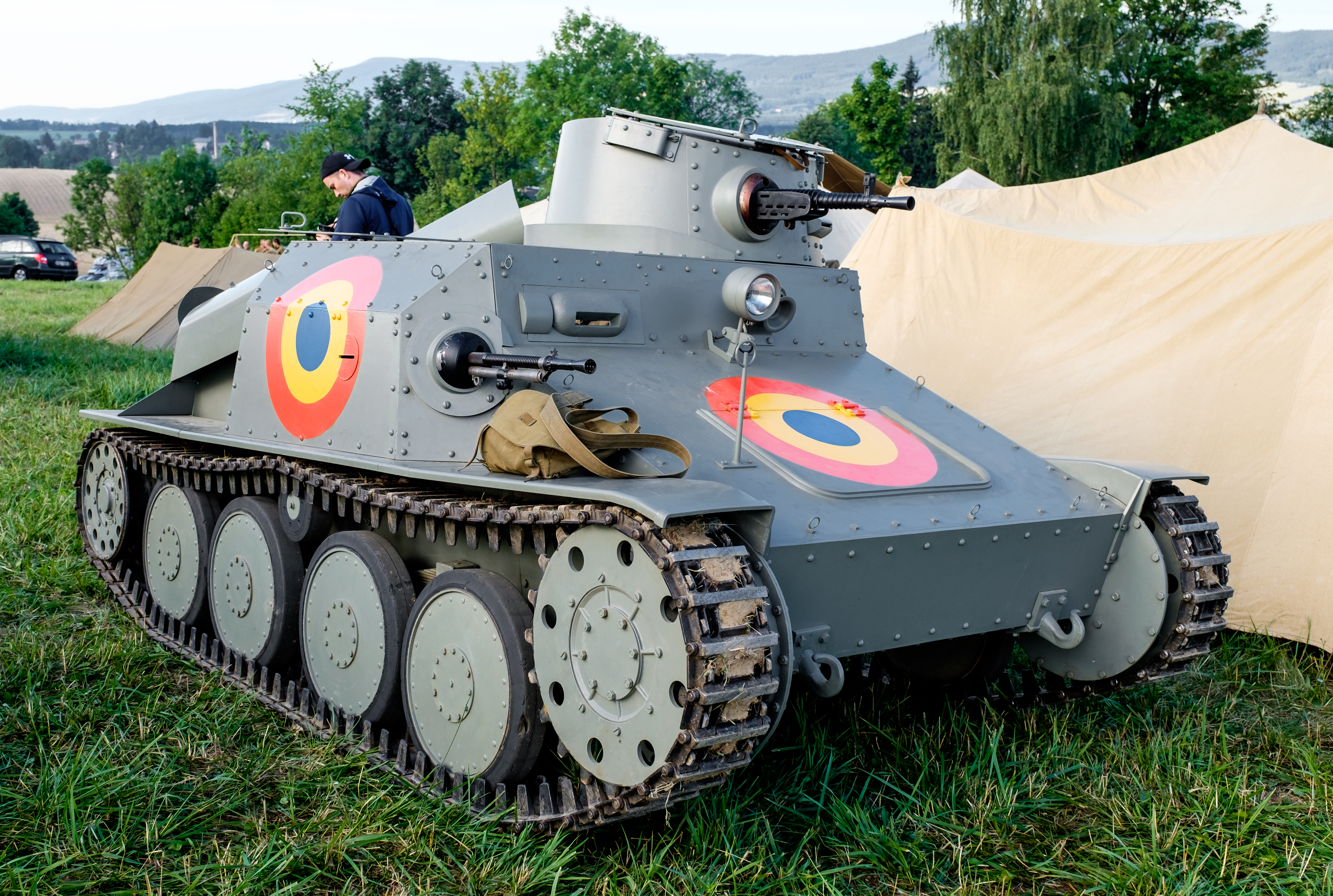
Replica of the Romanian-used R-1 tank, built at ČKD and under license in Romania

- BS-80 narrow gauge steam locomotive
- ChME3 locomotive
- D12E locomotive, serves for Vietnam Railways
- ChME5 large switching locomotive
- T 466.3 diesel locomotive
- T 434.0 locomotive
- T 478.3 locomotive
- T-669 locomotive

=== Tanks ===
- Tančík vz. 33 tankette
- AH-IV tankette, used by Romania as the modified R-1 variant
- St vz 39 medium tank
- LT vz. 34 light tank
- LT vz. 38 light tank

== See also ==
- List of tram builders
- Škoda Works
- Tatra (company)
- Inekon Trams
