= Gidon Lev =

Czechoslovak-born holocaust survivor (born 1935)

- גדעון לב
- Born: Peter Wolfgang Löw; 3 March 1935 (age 91); Karlovy Vary, Czechoslovakia
- Occupations: Farmer, writer, former TikTok educator
- Known for: Holocaust survivor
- Notable work: The True Adventures of Gidon Lev: Rascal, Holocaust Survivor, and Optimist

Gidon Lev (Hebrew: גדעון לב; born Peter Wolfgang Löw, 3 March 1935) (Note: See video content and title notes on Lev, Gidon (3 March 2022). #happybirthday #tiktokgrandpa #fyp. Archived from the original on 11 February 2023.) is a Czechoslovak-born Israeli dairy farmer and Holocaust survivor who was interned at the Nazi ghetto of Theresienstadt between the ages of 6 and 10. Of the 15,000 children imprisoned in or transported through Theresienstadt concentration camp, he is one of very few to have survived four years in the camp.

== Early life ==
Lev was born in Karlovy Vary, Czechoslovakia, on 3 March 1935. Both of his parents came from secular Jewish families that had lived for many generations in Austria-Hungary.

His family fled to Prague when Nazi Germany annexed the Sudetenland in 1938. In 1941, Lev and his family were transported to the Theresienstadt ghetto, a Nazi ghetto in Terezín, Czechoslovakia.

== Theresienstadt concentration camp ==
Lev was six years old when he was interned in the Theresienstadt ghetto with his family in 1941. Twenty-six of Lev's family members were murdered in the Holocaust, including his father, who died while being transported from Auschwitz to Buchenwald.

Lev was 10 years old when the Red Army liberated the concentration camp in May 1945. A total of 15,000 children were imprisoned at Terezín during the course of the war, according to Yad Vashem and the Terezín museum, and Lev was one of the very few to survive.

== Later life ==
After their release from the concentration camp and the end of World War II, Lev and his mother immigrated first to the United States and then to Canada in 1949. Ten years later, in 1959, Lev arrived in Israel and took up communal farming in the Kibbutz Hazorea in the Jezreel Valley.

Lev served in the Israeli Defense Force during the Six-Day War and the War of Attrition in 1967.

== TikTok career ==
Lev opened a TikTok account in July 2021 and has published videos primarily aimed at Holocaust education. He has received media coverage for speaking out against Holocaust denial and antisemitism.

In 2021, Lev released a TikTok video criticizing and demanding an apology from American podcaster Joe Rogan for drawing parallels between the Holocaust and mandatory proof-of-vaccination checks against COVID-19.

In November 2023, Lev deactivated his TikTok account, citing that he had lost thousands of followers and had received a barrage of hateful comments due to antisemitism following the 2023 Hamas-led attack on Israel.

== Published works ==
- Gray, Julie (2020). The true adventures of Gidon Lev. Gidon Lev. Ramat Gan, Israel. ISBN 978-1-7352497-0-4. OCLC 1162202880.
- Lev, Gidon (2024). Let's Make Things Better. Julie Gray. Ramat Gan, Israel. ISBN 978-1-0350439-8-9. OCLC 1475280024.

== Private life ==
Lev was married twice and has six children, 15 grandchildren and two great-granddaughters. He was married to his second wife for forty years, until she died of cancer in 2012.

Since 2017 he has been in a relationship with writer Julie Gray.
