= Tatra T5B6 =

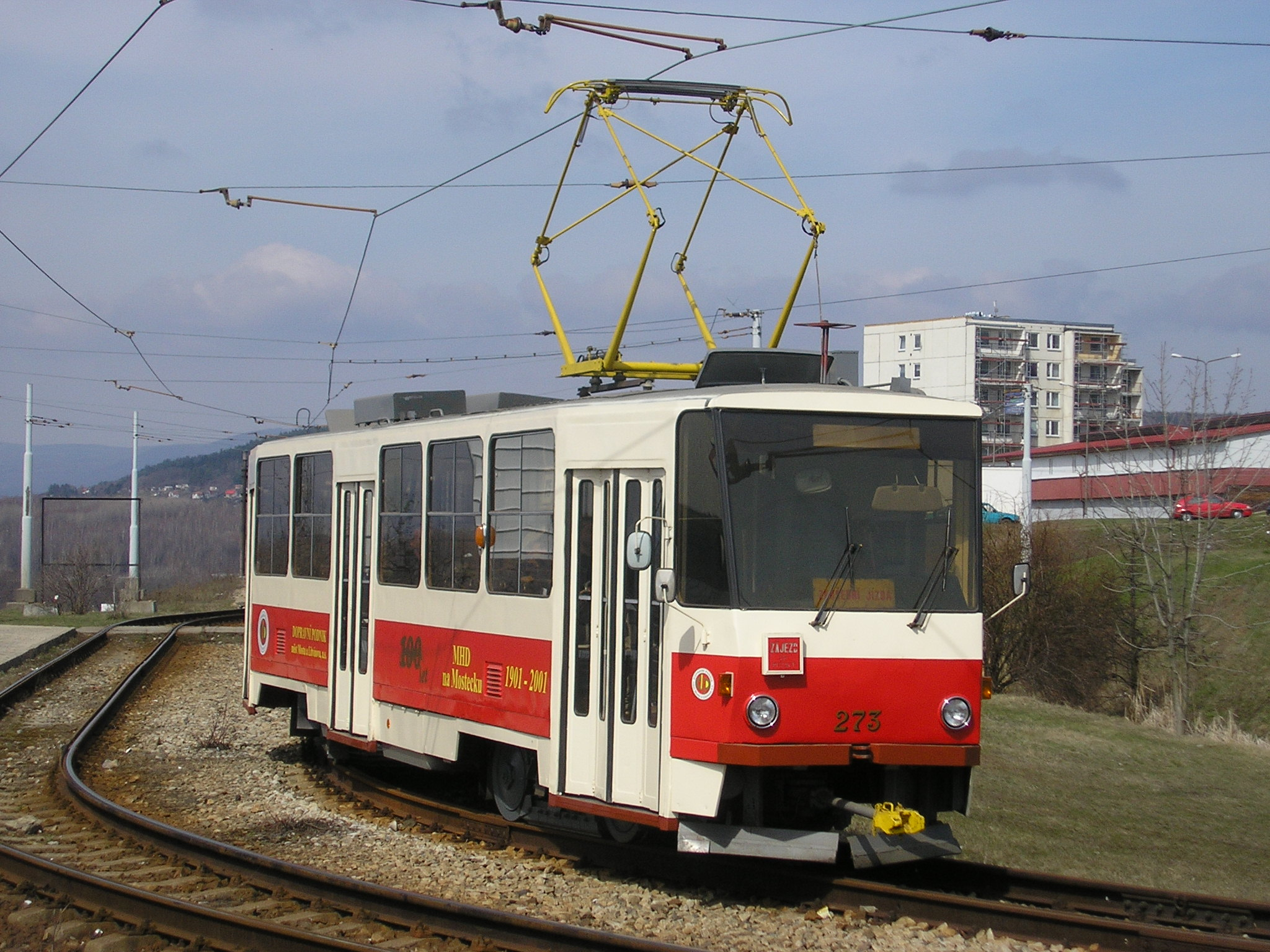
- Tatra T5B6 in Most
- Manufacturer: ČKD Tatra
- Assembly: (Czechoslovakia) Prague
- Family name: Tatra
- Constructed: 1976
- Entered service: 1978–1990
- Number built: 2
- Number preserved: 1
- Capacity: 122

Specifications
- Car length: 14,700 mm (48 ft 3 in)
- Width: 2,600 mm (8 ft 6 in)
- Height: 3,145 mm (10 ft 3.8 in)
- Doors: 3
- Maximum speed: 65 km/h (40 mph)
- Weight: 16,000 kg (35,000 lb)
- Engine type: TM 22
- Traction motors: 4
- Power output: 4×77 kW
- Electric system(s): 600 V DC
- Current collector(s): pantograph
- Wheels driven: 4
- Coupling system: Albert
- Track gauge: 1,000 mm (3 ft 3 3/8 in), 1,524 mm (5 ft)

The Tatra T5B6 was an experimental tramcar built in 1976 by ČKD Tatra.

== History ==
Having enjoyed widespread success throughout the Soviet Union with its earlier products, Tatra were keen to develop a new, modernised generation of tramcars for its clients. After initial runs on test-track at the Tatra factory, two prototypes were delivered to Most for evaluation, where they spent a year. The transport authorities in Most were however unwilling to pay a higher price for the T5B6 than they would otherwise have paid for the T3SU and no more orders were placed. The original prototype is still in Most, however it does not see active service and is kept only as an historic vehicle.
