= Tatra T6A2 =

Tramcar built by ČKD Tatra between 1985 and 1999

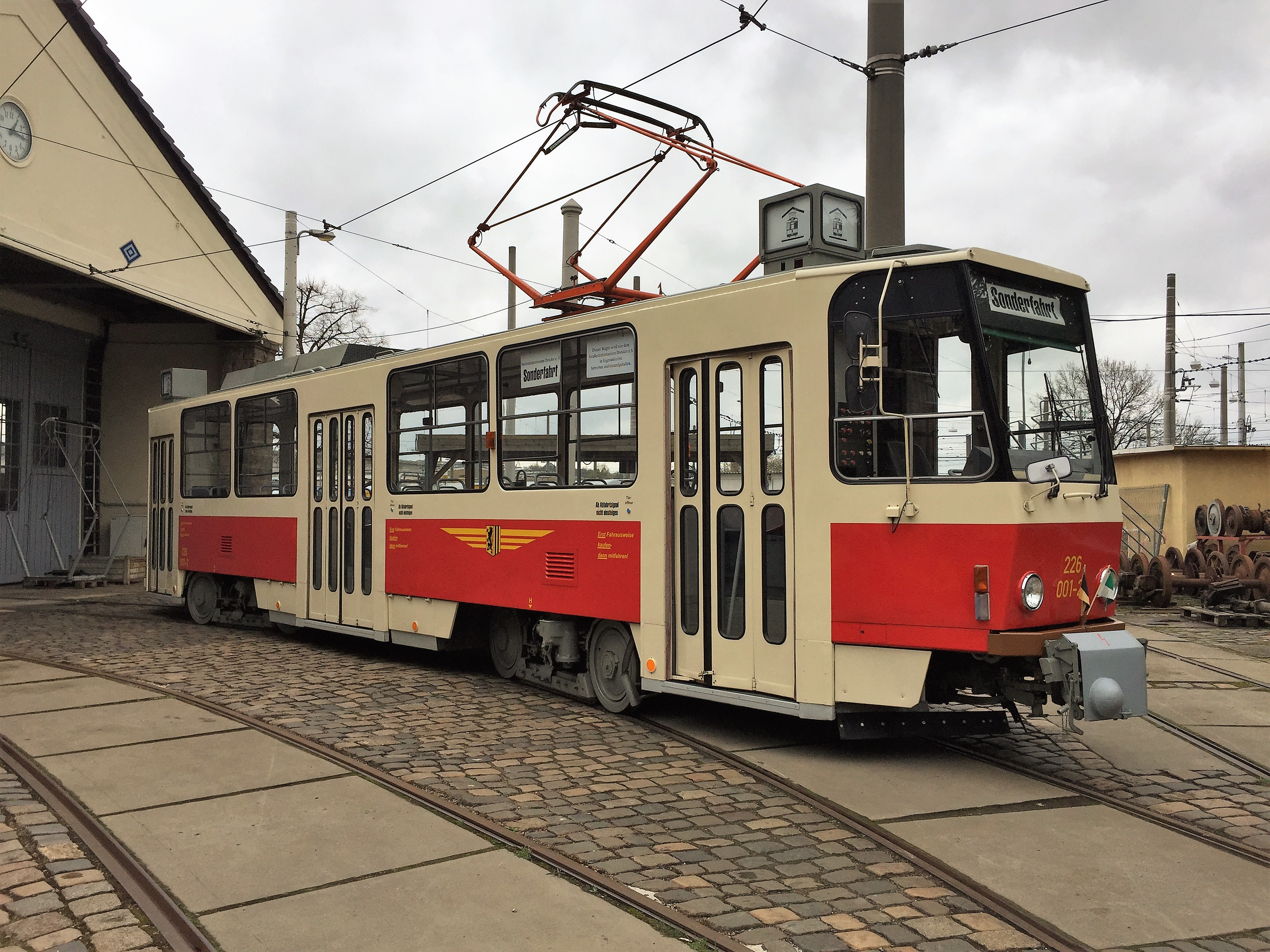
- Historical tramcar Tatra T6A2 in Dresden
- Manufacturer: ČKD Tatra
- Assembly: Prague
- Family name: Tatra
- Constructed: 1985–1999
- Number built: 256
- Predecessor: Tatra T3
- Capacity: 149 / 134

Specifications
- Car length: 14,500 mm (47 ft 7 in)
- Width: 2,200 mm (7 ft 3 in)
- Height: 3,110 mm (10 ft 2 in)
- Doors: 3
- Maximum speed: 55 km/h (34 mph)
- Weight: 18,300 kg (40,300 lb)
- Engine type: TE 023
- Traction motors: 4
- Power output: 4×45
- Electric system: 600 V DC
- Current collection: pantograph
- Wheels driven: 4
- Bogies: 2
- Coupling system: Scharfenberg
- Track gauge: 1,435 mm (4 ft 8 1/2 in), 1009 mm

The Tatra T6A2 was a tramcar built by ČKD Tatra between 1985 and 1999. Having enjoyed widespread success with its previous models among mainly Soviet customers, the T6A2 was quite different in appearance to its predecessors, and was bought extensively by cities in the former East Germany, as well as by Szeged (Hungary) and Sofia (Bulgaria).

== Variations ==
=== T6A2D/B6A2D ===
Towards the end of the 1980s, many East German cities required new trams to replace their aging fleets, and it was for this reason that Tatra commissioned the building of three prototype vehicles in 1985. These vehicles were tested first of all in Prague before being moved to Dresden. Between 1988 and 1991, 174 of the type were delivered to five East German cities. Berlin was the largest customer, taking delivery of 177 examples, plus a further 5 which were acquired from Rostock in 1995.

In 2011 six modernized vehicles from Berlin were sold to the Swedish city of Norrköping as a stop gap measure until new build low floor trams on loan to Stockholms new opened tram line arrived at their new home. All are withdrawn from service now, but there are plans to rebuild one into a maintenance vehicle.

=== T6A2B ===
The T6A2B was produced for the Sofia network, of which 40 were delivered in 1991. All of the 40 T6A2B were transferred from Krasna Polyana depot to Banishora depot.The units range from 3001[ex.2001]-3040[ex.2040]. Tram unit 3014 got a modernization, which included new LED destination boards from BUSTEC.

=== T6A2SF ===
The T6A2SF was produced for the Sofia network, of which 17 of them were delivered to Sofia.They range from unit 2041 to unit 2057, which out of all Unit 2057 is a unique unit because of its originally supplied BUSE Destination Boards.These units still stay at Krasna Polyana depot.

=== T6A2H ===
The 13 examples delivered to the Hungarian city of Szeged were labeled T6A2H and entered service in 1997 into a fleet that had previously consisted of exclusively Hungarian-built stock.

=== B6A2 trailer ===
A derivative of the T6A2 tram was the Tatra B6A2 unpowered trailer, manufactured between 1973 and 1988. The driver's section and headlights were removed and replaced with a seating section, similar to the rear of the tram, with variants being sold in a "2+1" configuration with 29 seats, or a "1+1" configuration with 20 seats. Motors and pantograph were also removed, with 600 V power for heating and lighting instead being supplied from one or two powered units via the ESW coupling. The braking system was taken from the B4 trailer, and used solenoid-operated disc brakes, powered by regenerative dynamic braking of the towing unit (or batteries while stationary), with the brakes also being equipped with an anti-slip system, as well as automatic spring-powered mechanical emergency brakes in case of power loss. A total of 92 trailers was made, all sold to various cities in Germany.

== Production ==
256 T6A2 trams and 92 B6A2 trailer cars were produced from 1985 to 1999 and delivered to:

| Country | City | Type | Delivery years | Number | Fleet numbers |
|---|---|---|---|---|---|
| Bulgaria | Sofia | T6A2B | 1991 – 1999 | 40 | 3001-3040 |
| Bulgaria | Sofia | T6A2SF | 1991 – 1999 | 17 | 2041-2057 |
| East Germany | Berlin | T6A2D | 1988 – 1990 | 118 | 218 101–218 218 |
| East Germany | Dresden | T6A2D | 1985 – 1988 | 4 | 226 001–226 004 |
| East Germany | Leipzig | T6A2D | 1988 – 1991 | 28 | 1001–1028 |
| East Germany | Magdeburg | T6A2D | 1989 | 6 | 1275–1280 |
| East Germany | Rostock | T6A2D | 1989 – 1990 | 24 | 601–624 |
| East Germany | Schwerin | T6A2D | 1989 | 6 | – |
| Hungary | Szeged | T6A2H | 1997 | 13 | 900–912 |
| Total: | | | | 256 | |

== Service today ==
=== B6A2D-M ===
Szeged Transport Company SzKT decided in 2003 to modernize its ageing fleet with refurbished used Tatra tramcars. As part of this program, in 2005 it bought four used B6A2D trailer cars from Rostock in order to convert them to cabless motor cars ("active trailers"). The cars underwent a complete refurbishment and modernization that included renewing the frame and bodywork, replacing the doors from four- to two-winged, as well as the seats. Modern electronic equipment with IGBT transistors was designed by Cegelec. The cars got motorized bogies that match those of type T6A2H, and half-pantographs. The tramcars do not have cabs but they got equipped with auxiliary driving controls at both ends that allow solo operation if needed. The appearance of the refurbished tramcars resembles that of the T6A2H. The modernized B6A2D-M cars are used on line 1 paired with a T6A2H in two-car consists, thus freeing up T6A2H cars that replaced old FVV tramcars (made in 1962) on other lines.

== Gallery ==
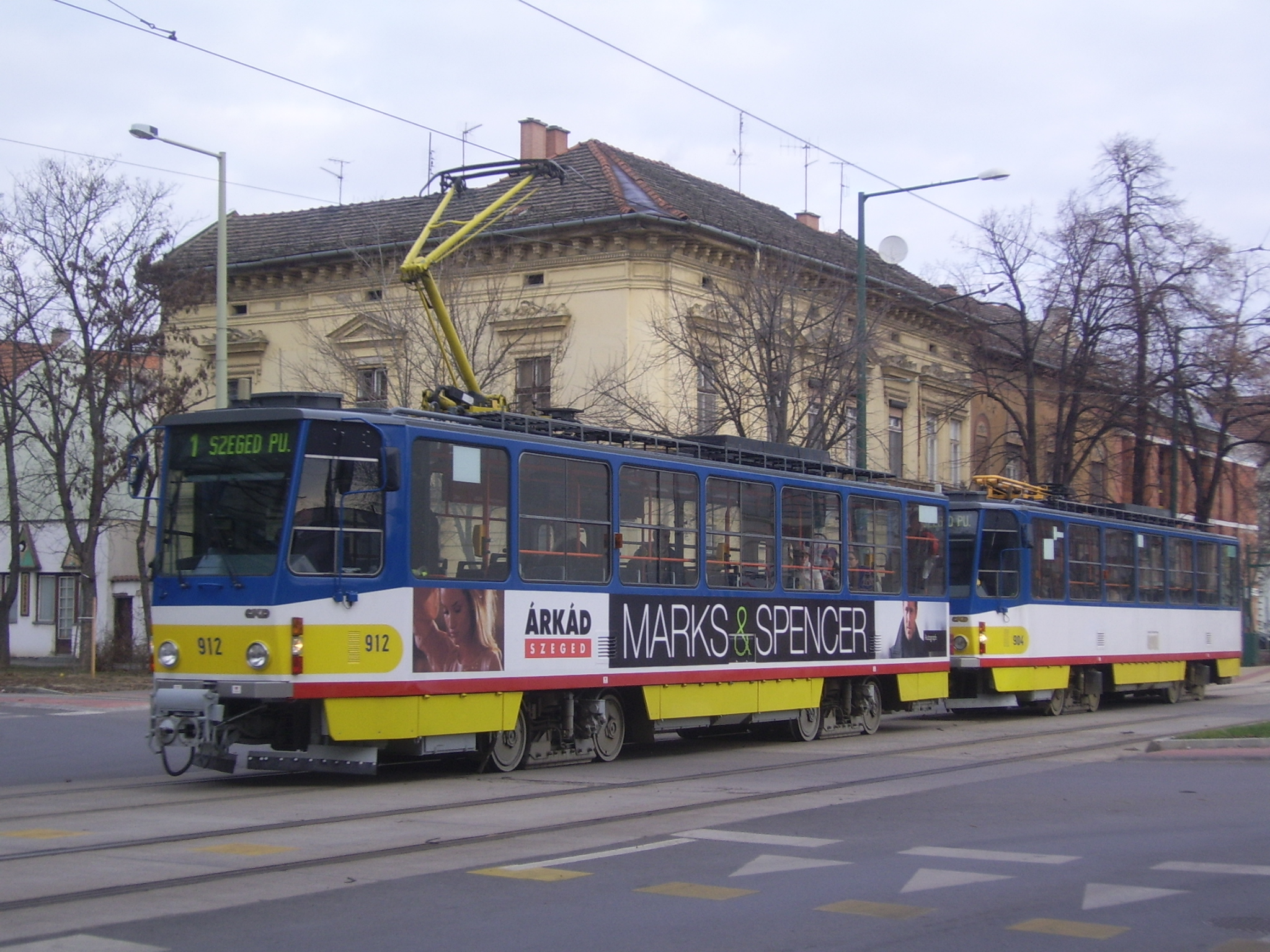
T6A2H in Szeged

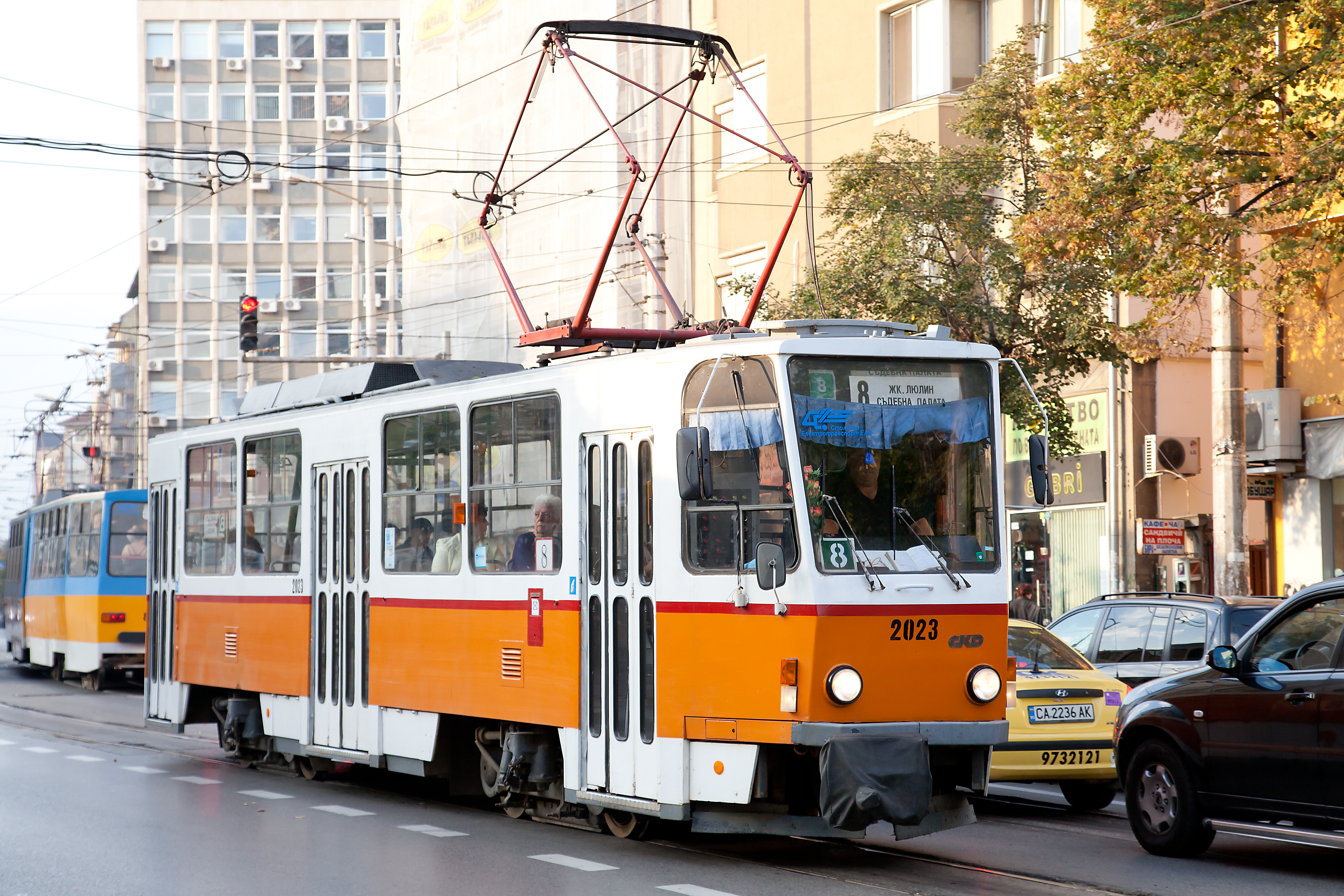
T6A2B in Sofia

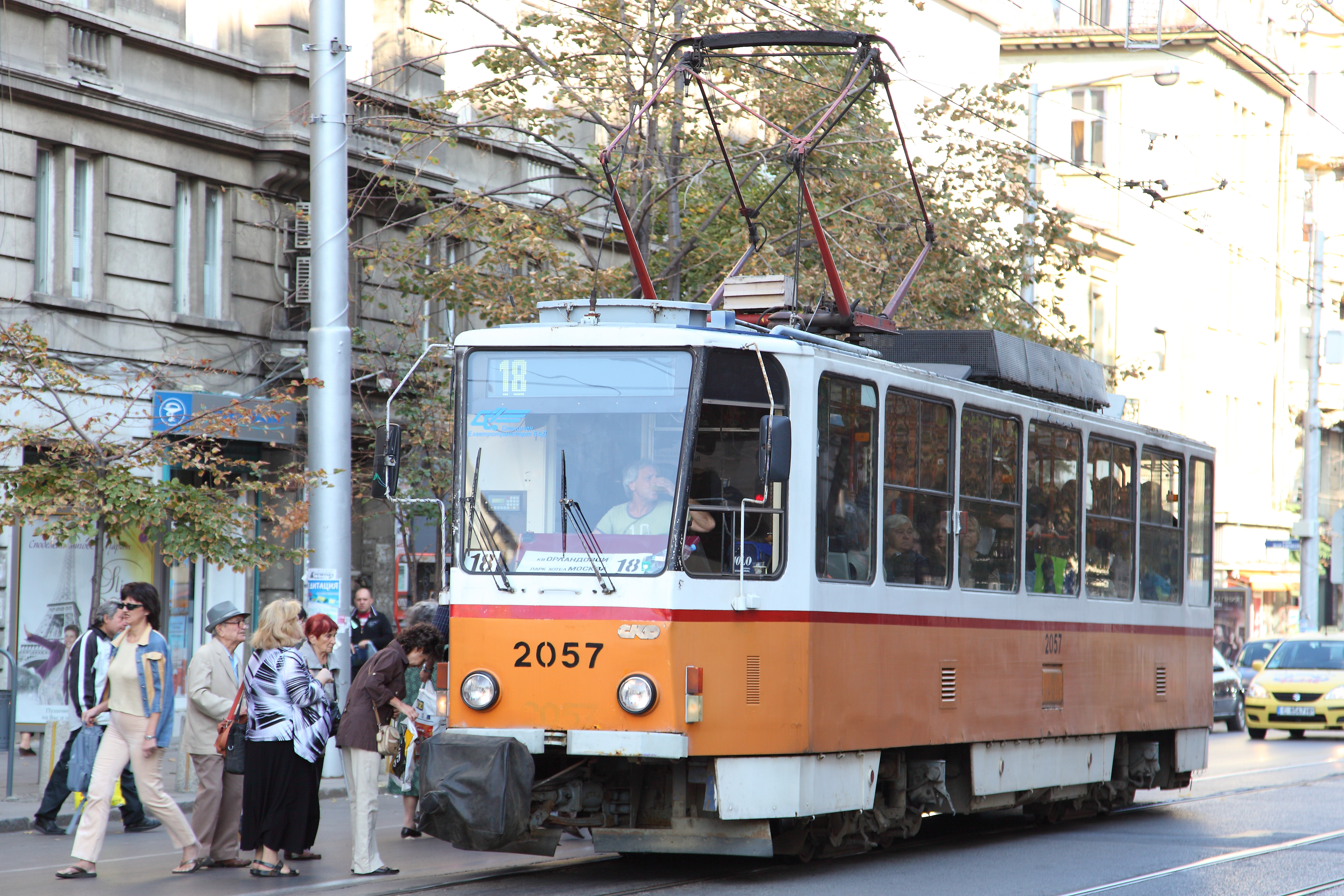
T6A2SF in Sofia

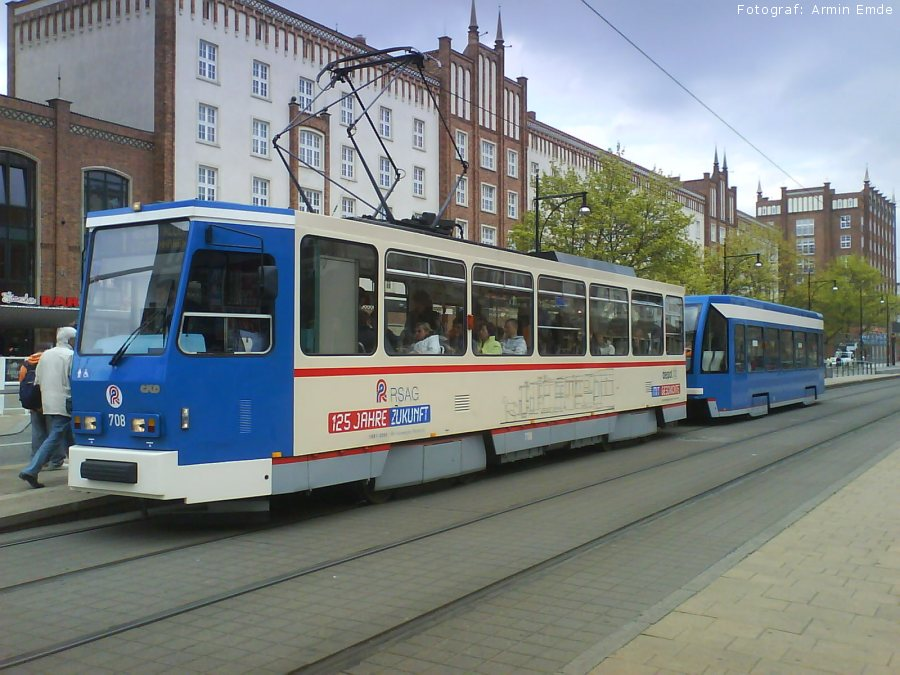
T6A2m in Rostock with a low-floor trailer

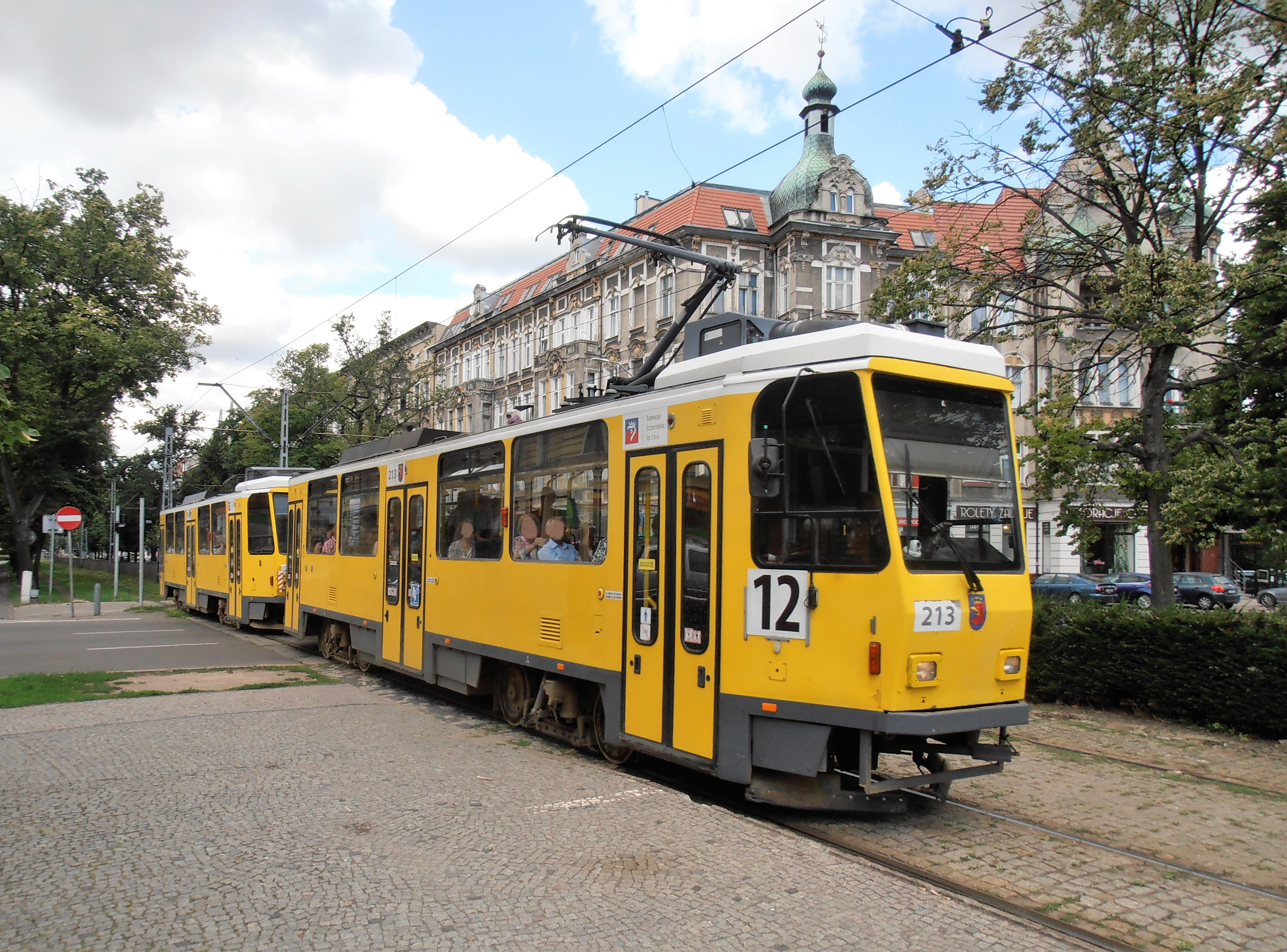
Tatra T6A2D in Szczecin, ex Berlin
