= List of World War II military equipment of Poland =

Polish Armament in 1939–45 article is a list of equipment used by Polish army before and during the Invasion of Poland, foreign service in British Commonwealth forces, the resistance Polish Home Army and last campaign to Germany with the Red Army in 1945. The list includes prototype vehicles.

== Aircraft ==
=== Fighters ===
- PZL P.7 (149)
- PZL P.11 (325)

=== Bombers ===
- PZL.23 Karaś (250)
- PZL.37 Łoś (120+)
- PZL.43 (54)

=== Strategic and photo-reconnaissance aircraft ===
- RWD-14 Czapla (65)

=== Air ambulances ===
- RWD-13 (≈100)
- Lublin R-XVI (7)

=== Trainers ===
- Bartel BM-4 (≈75)
- PWS-16 (40)
- PWS-18 (18)
- PWS-26 (310)
- RWD-8 (550+)
- RWD-17 (≈30)

=== Prototypes ===
- LWS-3 Mewa
- PWS-35 Ogar
- PZL.38 Wilk
- PZL.50 Jastrząb
- PZL.46 Sum

=== Foreign aircraft ===
- Schreck FBA-17
- LeO H-13
- LeO H-135
- Latham 43
- Avro Tutor Mk. I (2 examples)
- Breguet Bre XIX B.2
- CANT Z.506B Airone (1 example)
- Fokker F.VIIb-3m/M (21 examples)

=== Aircraft in use by Polish Air Force in France (1939–1940) ===
- Bloch MB.152
- Caudron C.714 C1 "Cyclone"
- Koolhoven F.K.58
- Morane-Saulnier M.S.406

=== Aircraft in use by Polish Air Force in Great Britain (1940–1947) ===
- Avro Lancaster
- Boulton Paul Defiant
- Bristol Beaufighter
- de Havilland Mosquito
- Fairey Battle
- Handley Page Halifax
- Hawker Hurricane
- Supermarine Spitfire
- Taylorcraft Auster
- Vickers Wellington
- Vickers Warwick
- Westland Lysander
- Consolidated B-24 Liberator
- North American B-25 Mitchell
- North American P-51 Mustang

=== Aircraft in use by Polish Air Force in Soviet Union (1943–1945) ===
- Yakovlev Yak-1b
- Yakovlev Yak-9
- Ilyushin Il-2m
- Petlyakov Pe-2
- Polikarpov UTI-4 / I-16 UTI
- Polikarpov U-2 / Po-2
- Shcherbakov Shche-2
- Yakovlev UT-2

== Military vehicles ==
=== Tankettes ===
- TK-3
- TKS
- TKS with 20 mm NKM

=== Tanks ===
- Renault FT
- Vickers E
- 7TP jw (jednowieżowy-single turret; 37 mm Bofors anti-tank gun)
- 7TP dw (dwuwieżowy-twin turret; with two wz. 30 Brownings)
- Renault R35
- Hotchkiss H35

=== Armored vehicles ===
- Samochód pancerny wz. 28
- Samochód pancerny wz. 29
- Samochód pancerny wz. 34
- Samochód pancerny Kubuś (improvised)
- Samochód pancerny Peugeot (French production)

=== Utility vehicles ===
- Sokół 1000
- C2P
- C4P
- C7P
- Polski-Fiat 508
- Polski-Fiat 508/518
- Polski-Fiat 508 III/W Łazik
- Polski-Fiat 618 Grom
- Polski-Fiat 621
- Ursus A
- Krupp L2H43 (bought from Germany before WW2)

=== Armored trains and annex equipment ===
- Armoured Train Number 11 "Danuta"
- Armoured Train Number 12 "Poznańczyk"
- Armoured Train Number 13 "Generał Sosnkowski"
- Armoured Train Number 14 "Paderewski"
- Armoured Train Number 15 "Śmierć"
- Armoured Train Number 51 "Pierwszy Marszałek"
- Armoured Train Number 52 "Piłsudczyk"
- Armoured Train Number 53 "Śmiały"
- Armoured Train Number 54 "Groźny"
- Armoured Train Number 55 "Bartosz Głowacki"

=== Prototypes ===
- TK-1
- TK-2
- TKF
- TKW
- TKD
- TKS-D
- Renault wz. 32
- PZInż. 130 amphibious tank
- PZInż. 140(4TP) reconnaissance tank
- 10TP wheel & track fast tank
- 14TP medium tank (never completed)
- WB-10 (2 prototypes)
- PZInż 222 (12 prototypes)
- PZInż 342

=== Vehicles used by Polish troops in Great Britain ===
- Universal Carrier
- Covenanter (used for training)
- Light tank Mk VIB (used for training)
- Crusader
- M3A1/A3 Stuart
- M5A1 Stuart
- Matilda Mk I (used for training)
- Cromwell cruiser tank
- Valentine Mk III (used for training)
- Challenger Mk VIII
- M3 Lee
- M4 Sherman
- Sherman Firefly
- Archer
- Achilles
- Sexton
- Crusader III AA
- M16 MGMC
- M17 MGMC
- Bedford OXA
- GM C15TA
- ACW-IP
- M3A1 Scout Car
- M5/A1 half-track
- Willys MB

=== Vehicles used by Polish troops in the Soviet Union ===
- BA-20
- BA-64
- T-60
- T-70
- T-34/76
- T-34/85
- SU-57
- SU-76
- SU-85
- SU-100
- ISU-122
- ISU-152
- SU-152 (used for training)
- IS-2 heavy tank
- ZIS-5/5V truck
- Studebaker US6 – US design also produced in USSR
- Willys MB

=== Captured German/Italian vehicles ===
- German
  - Steyr RSO
  - Sd.Kfz. 251/1 ausf. D
  - Sd.Kfz. 251/9
  - Sd.Kfz. 250/10
  - Marder II
  - Jagdpanzer 38(t)
  - StuG III G
  - Panzer II
  - Panzer IV J
  - Panzer V
- Italian
  - AB 41

== Small Arms ==
=== Helmets ===
- Adrian helmet
- Stahlhelm M16
- Hełm wz. 31
- SSh-39
- SSh-40
- Brodie helmet (British supplied)

=== Edged weapons ===
- Bagnet wz.1898/05
- Bagnet karabinowy wz.24
- Bagnet karabinowy wz.27
- Bagnet karabinowy wz.28
- Bagnet karabinowy wz.29

=== Sidearms ===
- Pistolet wz. 35 Vis (Similar to Colt M1911 but with some differences and in 9x19mm)
- Nagant wz.1932 (design form Nagant M1895)
- Modèle 1892 revolver (Supplied by the French to the Polish Armed Forces)

=== Submachine gun ===
- Mors submachine gun (Prototype, modelled after the German ERMA EMP-35)
- Sten gun (Mk II)
- Błyskawica Machine pistol
- Bechowiec-1
- Choroszmanów submachine gun (based roughly on the Soviet PPD-40)
- KIS Machine Pistol (copy of sten gun)
- KOP-PAL

=== Rifles and carbines ===
- Karabin wz.98 (copy of Gewehr 98)
- Karabin wz.98a
- Karabinek wz.29
- Karabinek wz. 91/98/25 (modified from Mosin Nagant rifle)
- Karabinek wz.98 PWU
- Kbsp wz. 1938M (Only 150 made)
- Lebel M1886/93
- Berthier M1907/15 rifle
- MAS-36
- StG 44
- Lee–Enfield No.1 Mk III and No.4 Mk I
- Mosin–Nagant M91/30
- SVT-40

=== Machine guns ===
- Browning wz.1928 (copy of BAR M1918)
- Chauchat 1915/27
- Ckm wz. 25 Hotchkiss (modified Hotchkiss M1914 to use 7.92x57mm)
- Ckm wz.30 (copy of Browning M1917)
- Ckm wz.32
- FM 24/29 light machine gun
- Bren machine gun
- Browning M1919
- Browning M2HB
- DP-27
- Maxim wz. 1910

=== Grenades ===
- Defensive grenade wz. 33
- Offensive grenade wz. 33
- Defensive grenade wz. 24
- Offensive grenade wz. 24
- Mills bomb
- RGD-33 grenade
- Molotov fire grenade (homemade from Polish Home Army)
- ET-38
- ET wz.40 (Also known as ET-40 "Filipinka")
- R wz.42 (Also known as "Sidolówka")
- Granat "Karbidówka"

=== Grenade launchers ===
- Granatnik wz.36

=== Anti-tank weapons ===
- Kb ppanc wz.35
- Boys anti-tank rifle
- PIAT
- PTRD-41
- PTRS-41
- Panzerschreck

== Artillery ==
=== Mortars ===
- wz.18 mortar (Stokes mortar)
- wz.18/31 mortar (Brandt Mle 27/31 produced under license)
- wz.28 mortar (Polish produced Stokes mortar)
- wz.31 mortar (Brandt Mle 27/31 produced under license)

=== Field cannons ===
- 75 mm armata wz.1897
- 76.2 mm armata wz.02/26 + 75 mm armata wz.02/26
- 105 mm armata wz. 13
- 105 mm Armata wz. 29
- 120 mm Armata wz. 78/09/31
- 120 mm Armata wz. 1878/10/31

=== Howitzers ===
- Haubica 100 mm wz. 1914/19A & wz. 1914/19P (produced around 900 pieces of their own licensed)
- 155 mm haubica wz. 1917
- Skoda 220 mm howitzer

=== Mountain guns ===
- Canon de 65 M (montagne) modele 1906

=== Anti-tank guns ===
- Wz.36 Bofors ( hundreds more were produced by SMPzA based Bofors 37 mm anti-tank gun)

=== Anti-aircraft guns ===
- 40 mm armata przeciwlotnicza wz. 36
- 75 mm Armata przeciwlotnicza wz. 1897
- 75 mm Armata przeciwlotnicza wz.1922/1924
- 75 mm armata przeciwlotnicza wz.36

== Naval weapons ==
=== Surface vessels, submarines and other ships ===
- Destroyers
  - ORP Błyskawica
  - ORP Grom
  - ORP Burza
  - ORP Wicher
  - ORP Garland
  - ORP Orkan
  - ORP Huragan
  - ORP Piorun
- Escort destroyers
  - ORP Krakowiak
  - ORP Kujawiak
  - ORP Ślązak
- Cruisers
  - ORP Dragon
  - ORP Conrad
- Heavy minelayer
  - ORP Gryf
- Minesweepers
  - ORP Jaskółka
  - ORP Rybitwa
  - ORP Mewa
  - ORP Czajka
  - ORP Czapla
  - ORP Żuraw
- Submarines
  - ORP Orzeł
  - ORP Sęp
  - ORP Wilk
  - ORP Ryś
  - ORP Żbik
  - ORP Jastrząb
  - ORP Dzik
  - ORP Sokół
- Torpedo vessel
  - ORP Mazur
- Auxiliary boat
  - ORP Nurek
- Sea patrol boat
  - ORP General Haller
- River patrol boat
  - ORP Kraków

=== Coastal artillery defenses ===
- Heliodor Laskowski's Artillery Battery No. 31 (XXXI) - four 152 mm coastal cannon
- "Smok Kaszubski" improvised armored train
- Armored Train (Unknown name)

=== River boat local projects ===
- Type I fast monitor
- Type MC monitor
