= Armoured trains of Poland =

World War I era trains

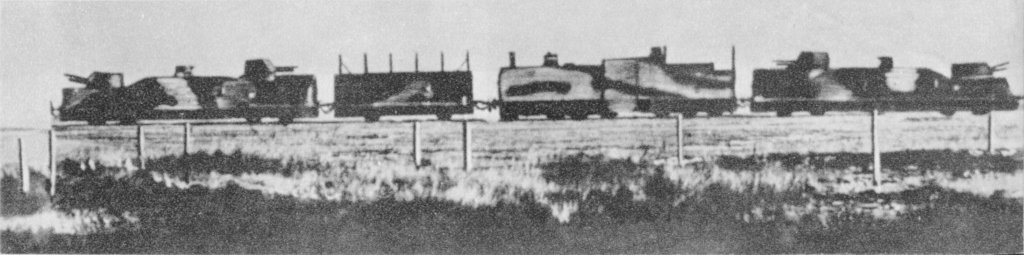
Armored train "Danuta" in 1939

Armored trains of Poland mostly date to the World War I period. Many of them were modernized over the next two decades, and took part in most military conflicts of the Second Polish Republic, namely the Greater Poland Uprising, the Polish-Ukrainian War, the Polish-Bolshevik War, the Silesian Uprisings and the Polish September Campaign in World War II. Armored trains were also used by the Polish Armed Forces in the West as well as in the post-war period by the Polish Railroad Guards (Straż Ochrony Kolei) and the People's Army of Poland.

== 1918–1939 ==
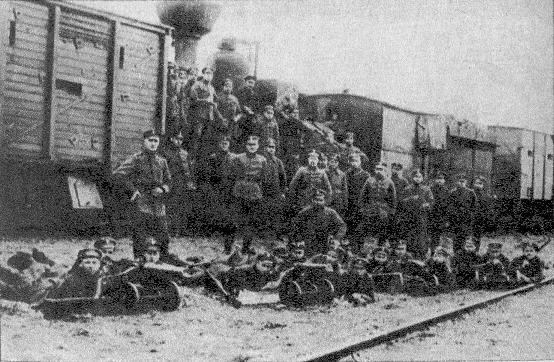
The crew of armored train Odsiecz in 1919, during the Polish-Soviet War

The first use of armored trains by Polish forces dates to late in World War I and the Russian Civil War period (1918–19), when Polish Armed Forces in the East (Polish I Corps in Russia and other units) operated seven different armored trains (six improvised and one captured).

From 1918 through 1920 the newly created Polish Army received about 90 armored trains, mostly from workshops in Kraków, Nowy Sącz, Lwów (Lviv), Warsaw and Wilno (Vilnius). Many of them were classified as improvised, and consisted of regular trains and wagons armored with metal gates, cement and sandbags; the soldiers called them "mobile trenches". Some equipment came from the Austro-Hungarian 3rd Armored Division, whose equipment was acquired by a unit of the Polish Military Organization.

Several armored trains fought supporting the Polish forces in the Greater Poland uprising (1918–9) and the Polish-Ukrainian War (1918–19). The armored trains saw major action in the Polish-Soviet War (1919–21). Approximately 50 armored trains participated in that conflict on the Polish side; on average, about twenty were in active service at any given time. Sixteen armored trains supported the Polish insurgents during the Third Silesian Uprising.

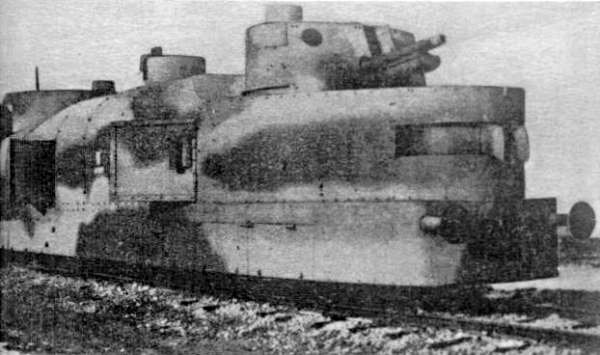
Artillery wagon, used in Polish armored trains "Śmiały" and "Piłsudczyk" (before 1939)

In 1921 the armored trains forces were reorganized into 6 divisions, each composed of two trains, attached to train engineers regiments (1st in Kraków, 2nd in Jabłonna (Legionowo) and 3rd in Poznań). In 1924 the 3rd Regiment was disbanded, and the remaining armored train divisions were transformed into the Armored Trains Training Division in Jabłonna (Legionowo). The Training Division, in 1925 renamed to Educational Division, in 1927 was reorganized into the 1st Armored Train Division. In 1928 the 2nd Armored Train Division was formed in Niepołomice. Each division had 6 trains. In 1929, the Polish Engineering Force was reorganized, with the 1st and 2nd Train Engineer Regiments being transformed into Train Bridges Battalions.

In 1931, the modernization of armored trains was finished with similar armament installed on most units. The trains were classified as either "light" or "heavy". "Light" trains had two artillery and one infantry wagons, and World War I-era Austro-Hungarian or Russian weapons (two to four 75mm guns, eight to sixteen heavy machine guns, and two anti-aircraft heavy machine guns). "Heavy" trains had a better engine (Ti3), 100mm guns in addition to the 75mm pieces and gun turrets for the heavy machine guns. The trains were also accompanied by several light tanks (FT-17s or tankettes). Each train had its own supply train that contained living quarters, kitchen, workshop, a compartment for the wounded personnel, and supplies. Together, a train (combat and supply) had a crew of 8 officers, 59 warrant officers and 124 regular infantrymen. Around the mid-1930s, revisions to Poland's tactical and strategic doctrines meant that armored trains, previously considered a high-quality force, begun to be seen as increasingly obsolete on the battlefield.

== 1939–1945 (WWII) ==
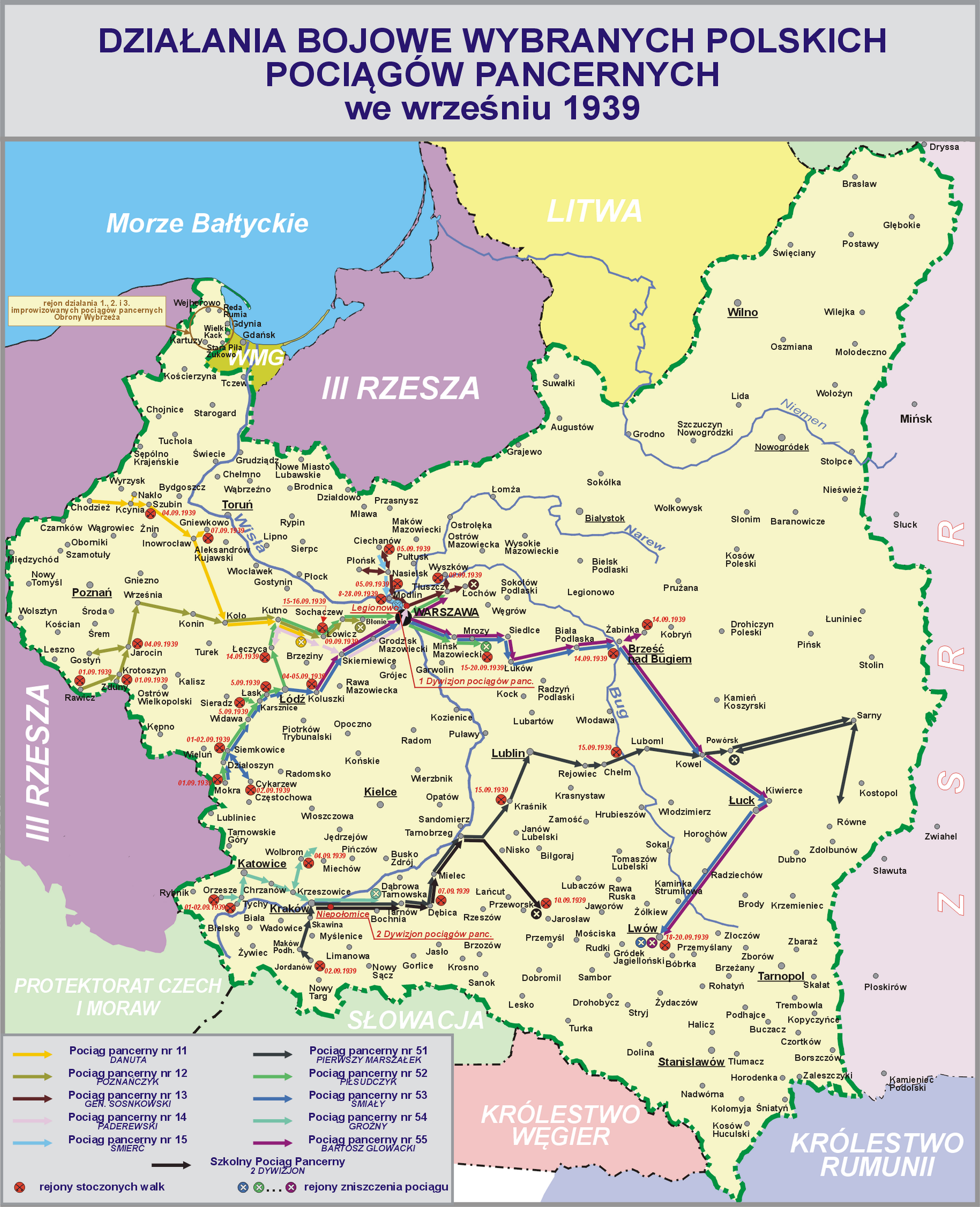
Combat operations of Polish armored trains in the Polish September Campaign (1939)

The ten trains of the 1st and 2nd Armored Trains Divisions were mobilized in late August to early September, and received numbers 11–5 (1st Division) and 51–5 (2nd Division). With the exceptions of trains 14 and 15 which finished forming on 3 September and were assigned to the reserves of the High Command, all other trains finished forming before the start of hostilities on 1 September. The 2nd Division also fielded a lightly armed training armored train, although it was not supposed to be used in the frontline combat.

The command of the Land Coastal Defence decided to field improvised trains to bolster its defenses. The first was ready before the war began, two others were finished during the hostilities. They used weapons from the Riverine Flotilla of the Polish Navy and the unfinished ORP Orkan and Huragan destroyers. The first train was destroyed after four days of fighting on 4 September, the second, less than a day after it entered service (it entered service on 3 September and was destroyed on the night of 3 to 4 September). The last train, "Smok Kaszubski" (Kashubian Dragon) entered combat on 7 September, and was operational till 12 September.

On 20 September, during the siege of Warsaw, two improvised armored trains were formed (Nr. 1 and Nr. 2). Not much is known about their combat operations; the first train entered service on 22 September, and the second a day later.

The following armored trains fought with the Polish Army in the September Campaign:

- Armored Train no 11 (Pociąg Pancerny nr 11), formerly "Danuta" – kpt. Bolesław Korobowicz, attached to Army Poznań. Destroyed on 16 September.
- Armored Train no 12 (Pociąg Pancerny nr 12), formerly "Poznańczyk" – kpt. Kazimierz Majewski, attached to Army Poznań. Destroyed on 9 September.
- Armored Train no 13 (Pociąg Pancerny nr 13), formerly “Generał Sosnkowski” – kpt. Stanisław Młodzianowski, attached to Army Modlin. Destroyed on 10 September.
- Armored Train no 14 (Pociąg Pancerny nr 14), formerly "Paderewski" – kpt. Jerzy Zelechowski, from 9 September kpt. Henryk Galwelczyk, reserve of the High Command, later attached to Army Pomorze. Destroyed on 16 September.
- Armored Train no 15 (Pociąg Pancerny nr 15), formerly "Śmierć" – kpt. Kazimierz Kubaszewski, reserve of the High Command. Destroyed on 28 September.
- Armored Train no 51 (Pociąg Pancerny nr 51), formerly "Pierwszy Marszałek" – kpt. Leon Cymborski, from 2 September kpt. Zdzisław Rokossowski, attached to Army Kraków. Destroyed on 22 September.
- Armored Train no 52 (Pociąg Pancerny nr 52), formerly "Piłsudczyk" – kpt. Mikolaj Gonczar, attached to Army Łódź. Destroyed on 20 September.
- Armored Train no 53 (Pociąg Pancerny nr 53), formerly "Śmiały" – kpt. Mieczysław Malinowski, attached to Army Łódź. Surrendered on 22 September.
- Armored Train no 54 (Pociąg Pancerny nr 54), formerly "Groźny" – kpt. Jan Rybczyński, from 2 September kpt. Józef Kulesza, attached to Army Kraków. Destroyed on 7 September.
- Armored Train no 55 (Pociąg Pancerny nr 55), formerly "Bartosz Głowacki" – kpt. Andrzej Podgórski, first attached to Grupa Operacyjna Wyszków, from 3 September, attached to Army Prusy. Destroyed on 19 September.
- Training Armored Train – kpt. Franciszek Pietrzak. Destroyed on 10 September.
- (Improvised) Armored Train no 1 (Pociąg Pancerny nr 1) – improvised for the defense of Warsaw, por. rez. br. panc. Tadeusz Studziński. Presumed destroyed at an unknown date.
- (Improvised) Armored Train no 2 (Pociąg Pancerny nr 2) – improvised for the defense of Warsaw – por. rez. br. panc. Stanisław Waskiewicz. Presumed destroyed at an unknown date.
- First Improvised Train of the Land Coastal Defense (Pierwszy improwizowany pociąg pancerny Obrony Wybrzeża) – por. Zygmunt Budzyński. Destroyed on 4 September.
- Second Improvised Train of the Land Coastal Defense (Drugi improwizowany pociąg pancerny Obrony Wybrzeża) – por. A. Matuszak. Destroyed on 4 September.
- Third Improvised Train of the Land Coastal Defense "Kashubian Dragon" (Trzeci improwizowany pociąg pancerny Obrony Wybrzeża "Smok Kaszubski") – kpt. mar. Jerzy Tadeusz Bleszynski, and later por. mar. Adrian F. Hubick. Destroyed on 12 September.

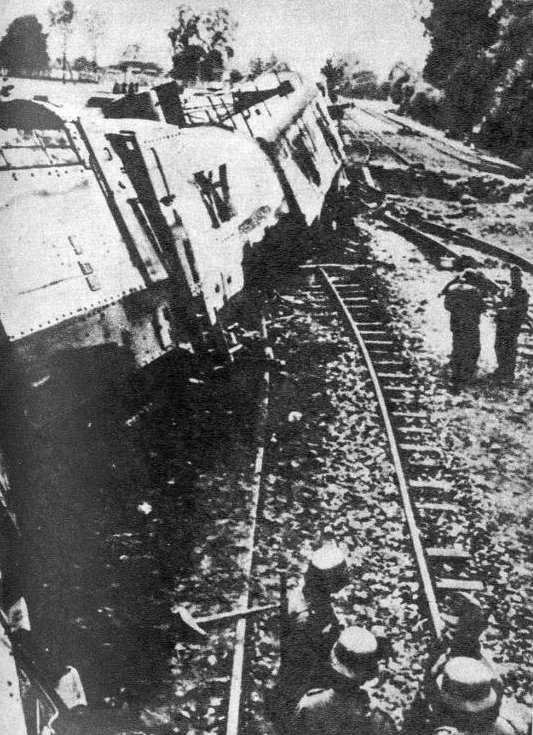
Wreck of the Armored Train no 13, surveyed by the Germans, some time after its destruction.

During the Polish September Campaign, Polish armored trains took part in roughly 90 clashes with the German units. They played a significant role in several encounters, most notably, no 53 made an important contribution to the Polish victory in the Battle of Mokra, and no 54 was used very successfully in the defense of Silesia. Armored trains were responsible for destroying or damaging several dozens of armored vehicles, including tanks, shot down or damaged three airplanes, and inflicted numerous infantry casualties. Only two trains (no 11 and 55) were destroyed in direct combat by the German land forces, and only no 13 was destroyed by the German air force. Remaining trains were abandoned and destroyed by their own crews when they ran out of munitions and could no longer retreat. The successful role of the armored trains, considered obsolete by both Polish and German strategists, caused the revision of that judgment by both sides.

About a dozen Polish armoured trains in Britain were formed by the Polish Armed Forces in the West, and were assigned to patrol the British railways in 1940. They saw no combat, and were disbanded by July 1943.

== 1945–1952 ==
After the war, in the Republic of Poland, Railroad Guards (Straż Ochrony Kolei) used four armored trains from 1945 to 1950. In 1947, a Train Artillery Division was formed, and disbanded in 1952.
