= List of armoured trains =

This is a list of armoured trains of different countries.

== Canada ==
- The No. 1 Armoured Train

During World War II, the Canadian high command implemented this armoured train for protection of the Canadian National Railway line between Prince Rupert, an important naval port for the Aleutian Island campaign, and Terrace, from potential attack by Japanese aircraft, submarines/gunboats, and infantry. The train eventually was composed of a gondola with a WWI-era 75mm gun and searchlight, a gondola with two 40mm Bofors anti-aircraft guns, a troop boxcar, a kitchen car, and a steam locomotive, with all the cars outfitted with armour. A diesel engine was also experimentally outfitted with armoured plate but by the time it was finished, the train had been taken out of service as the Japanese threat was no longer an issue.

== Croatia ==
- Croatian Armored Train

Croatian Army possesses one armoured train which mounted French Hotchkiss H38 turrets.

== Cuba ==
- Tren Blindado - (armored train) - The train belonged to General Fulgencio Batista and was captured by Che Guevara.

== Estonia ==
Broad-gauge:

- Broad-gauge armoured train nr. 1 "Kapten Irw”
- Broad-gauge armoured train nr. 2
- Broad-gauge armoured train nr. 3
- Broad-gauge armoured train nr. 4
- Broad-gauge armoured train nr. 5
- Broad-gauge armoured train nr. 6

Narrow-gauge:

- Narrow-gauge armoured train nr. 1
- Narrow-gauge armoured train nr. 2
- Narrow-gauge armoured train nr. 3
- Narrow-gauge armoured train nr. 4
- Narrow-gauge armoured train nr. 5

== Finland ==
=== 1918 ===
A handful of armored trains were in use by both parties during Finnish Civil War (1918), including trains supplied to the Reds by the Russian Bolshevik government.

=== 1939–1940, 1941–1944 ===
Finnish Army employed two armored trains in limited use even during the Winter War and Continuation War (WWII), at the later stages mainly for AA support. One train composed of surviving cars of Civil War and WWII vintage is now an exhibit at Parola Tank Museum. Armored train at Parola Tank Museum

== France ==
=== First Indochina War (1946–1954) ===
- La Rafale, two trains blindés ("TB", armoured trains) were used by the 2e Etranger (French Foreign Legion) from 1948 to 1954 in French Indochina (Vietnam and Cambodia).

== Germany ==
Asien - a VIP trainset used by Hermann Goering had two cars armed with two sets of Oerlikon anti-aircraft cannons.

Schwerer Gustav - a massive 1,350 ton artillery train. it had 80 cm 7,100 kg with 250 kg explosive filling (concrete piercing); or 4,800 kg with 700 kg explosive filling (high explosive.) it served in the war in France in 1941. it was destroyed before being captured.

== Hungary ==
=== 1939–1945 ===
101. sz. páncélvonat - high train:

- machine-gun wagon ( 1 x 36M 37mm AT gun, 1 x 36M 20mm AP gun, 4 x 31M 8mm machine gun)
- MÁV 377 locomotive
- casemate-wagon (1 x 18M 8 cm field gun, 1 x 36M 20mm AP gun, 2 x 31M 8mm machine gun)

102. sz. páncélvonat - flat train:

- machinegun wagon ( 1 x 36M 37mm AT gun, 1 x 36M 20mm heavy gun, 4 x 31M 8mm machine gun)
- MÁV 377 locomotive
- artillery wagon (1 x 22M 8 cm field gun, 1 x 36M 20mm AP gun, 2 x 31M 8mm machine gun)

103. sz. páncélvonat - high train:

- machine-gun wagon ( 1 x 36M 37mm AT gun, 1 x 36M 20mm AP gun, 4 x 31M 8mm machine gun)
- MÁV 377 locomotive
- casemate-wagon (1 x 22M 8 cm field gun, 1 x 36M 20mm AP gun, 2 x 31M 8mm machine gun)

104. sz. páncélvonat - self-propelled, motor-driven train ( 1 x 36M 20mm AP gun, 1 x 22M 8 cm field gun, 2 x 31M 8mm machine gun)

"Éva" - improvised armoured train, later renamed to "Botond"

== Indonesia ==
- Panser Rel V16

The debut of the Panser Rel V16 (English: Rail Panzer V16) was during the DI/TII conflict in West Java in the period 1955 – 1962, designed and produced by Bengkel Peralatan Angkatan Darat (English: Army Equipment Workshop) now Pindad. This Rail Panzer was used to escort the train from Ciawi to Cicalengka (PP) which was often disturbed and overthrown by DI/TII Troops. Panser Rel V16 is capable of traveling at a maximum speed of 80 km per hour.

== Iraq ==
- Iraqi armored train

During the Anglo-Iraqi War the British reported capturing an Iraqi armoured train near Basra in May 1941.

== Japan ==
These trains were built for use in Manchukuo.

=== Armoured vehicles and auxiliary support vehicles ===
- Type K2 steam locomotive No.134
- Type C56 steam locomotive No.31
- Type 91 Sumida M.2593 broad-gauge armoured railroad car
- Type 95 So-Ki armoured railroad car
- Type 98 railroad tractor
- Type 100 railroad tractor
- Type 2598 railroad car
- Railroad construction vehicle

=== Railway heavy cannon ===
- Type 90 240 mm Railway cannon (Futtsu cannon)
- Generator waggon for Type 90 240 mm Railway cannon

=== Armoured trains ===
Type 94 armoured train was built in 1934 and was deployed in Manchuria. It first operated with 8 cars and later an additional car was added. For armament, it had two Type 14 10 cm AA guns and two Type 88 75 mm AA guns.

==== Special armoured train ====
An armoured train built in 1933 was designated "Rinji Soko Ressha" (Special Armored Train). It had 12 cars and armament consisting of one Type 14 10 cm AA gun, one Type 4 15 cm howitzer and two Type 11 AA guns. It was deployed in Manchuria with the 2nd Armored Train Unit.

==== Others types of Japanese armoured trains ====
Improvised armoured trains were built by the Japanese in the 1920s. They were converted from regular passenger trains. The trains were used to guard the railways in Manchuria.

== Lithuania ==
Armoured trains:

- Half-armoured train "Gediminas". It was formed on 25 August 1920 and was manned by a crew of 69. The train was armed with 4-6 French 75 mm Schneider field canons, 2 German 105 mm fieldhowitzer, arranged on open platforms, it had 2 armoured cars armed with 4-16 German 7,92 mm Maxim 08/15 machine guns. Part of the train was taken over by Poles during false flag operation of Żeligowski's Mutiny and made into Polish armoured train "Jan Kiliński". Part of the train, which stayed in Lithuanian army, was updated and served until decommissioning in 1935.
- Armoured train "Kęstutis", formed in 1921, decommissioned in 1927.
- Armoured train "Algirdas", formed in 1921, decommissioned in 1924.

== North Korea ==
- Taeyangho armoured train - North Korea's presidential train is currently used by Kim Jong Un but has been used by his predecessors.

== Poland ==
=== Before 1918 ===
- Dywizja Syberyjska (Siberian Division) had 3 armoured trains: Warszawa, Kraków and Poznań, and captured a fourth: Poznań II
- 10 February-10 May1918 improvised armoured train of Związek Broni.

=== Battle of Lwów ===
- Kozak
- Piłsudczyk
- PP 3
- Gromobój
- Pionier

=== Polish-Soviet War ===
Names of fifty trains have been confirmed, but it is hard to be sure the exact number that remain to be found. Near the end of the war, on December 1, 1920, twenty-six trains formed the part of the armoured train Polish forces:

- nr 1 Piłsudczyk
- nr 2 Śmiały
- nr 3 Lis-Kula
- nr 4 Hallerczyk
- nr 5 Stefan Batory
- nr 6 Generał Iwaszkiewicz
- nr 7 Chrobry
- nr 8 Wilk
- nr 9 Danuta
- nr 10 Pionier
- nr 11 Poznańczyk
- nr 12 Kaniów
- nr 13 Zawisza Czarny
- nr 14 Zagończyk
- nr 15 Paderewski
- nr 16 Mściciel
- nr 17 Reduta Ordona
- nr 18 Huragan
- nr 19 Podhalanin
- nr 20 Bartosz Głowacki
- nr 21 Pierwszy Marszałek
- nr 22 Groźny
- nr 23 Śmierć
- nr 24 Śmigły
- nr 25 Stefan Czarniecki
- nr 26 Generał Sosnkowski

Other:

- Gromobój
- Rozwadowczyk
- Saper
- Smok
- Śmiały-szeroki – disbanded on 2 April 1920

Lost in 1920:

- Boruciątko
- Boruta – 25 July at Kuźnica
- Dąbrowski – 5 July at Równe
- Generał Dowbór – 6 June at Wczerajsze
- Generał Konarzewski – 9 July at Bobrujsk
- Generał Listowski – 2 August at Terespol
- Generał Sikorski – 26 June Słowieczne
- Piłsudczyk szeroki – 19 July at Baranowicze
- Pionier-szeroki – 17 June

In mid-1921, twelve trains were disbanded, and others were standardized. The twelve were retained and formed six divisions (dywizjon), which were attached to three regiments (pułks) of train sappers:

- nr 1 Piłsudczyk
- nr 2 Śmigły
- nr 3 Pierwszy Marszałek
- nr 4 Groźny
- nr 5 Danuta
- nr 6 Zagończyk
- nr 7 Paderewski
- nr 8 Śmierć
- nr 9 Poznańczyk
- nr 10 Bartosz Głowacki
- nr 11 Stefan Czarniecki
- nr 12 Generał Sosnkowski

In 1924 those divisions were disbanded, and their equipment deposited in mobilisation reserve stores. For training purposes a training division was created (attached to the 2nd Regiment of Train Sappers in Jabłonno). This division retained two trains:

- Danuta
- Generał Sosnkowski

In January 1925 this division was renamed 'Armoured Train Training Division'.

=== Third Silesian Uprising (1921) ===
June 1921: 1 dywizjon

- nr 1 Korfanty
- nr 2 Nowina-Doliwa

2 dywizjon

- nr 3 Piorun
- nr 4 Naprzód

3 dywizjon

- nr 5 Powstaniec
- nr 6 Ślązak

4 dywizjon

- nr 7 Bajończyk
- nr 8 Górnik

5 dywizjon

- nr 9 Lubieniec
- nr 10 Ludyga

6 dywizjon

- nr 12 Pantera
- nr 13 Nowak (Nowak II)

7 dywizjon

- nr 14 Zygmunt Powstaniec
- nr 15 Tadek Ślązak

8 dywizjon

- nr 11 Lew
- nr 16 Testart (Piast)

Other:

- Kabicz – narrow track
- Ułan

=== September 1939 ===
- nr 11 Danuta (commander – kpt. Bolesław Korobowicz)
- nr 12 Poznańczyk (commander – kpt. Kazimierz Majewski)
- nr 13 Generał Sosnkowski (commander – kpt. Stanisław Młodzianowski)
- nr 14 Paderewski (commander – kpt. Jerzy Żelechowski)
- nr 15 Śmierć (commander – kpt. Kazimierz Kubaszewski)
- nr 51 Pierwszy Marszałek (commander – kpt. Leon Cymborski)
- nr 52 Piłsudczyk (commander – kpt. Mikołaj Gonczar)
- nr 53 Śmiały (commander – kpt. Mieczysław Malinowski)
- nr 54 Groźny (commander – kpt. Jan Rybczyński)
- nr 55 Bartosz Głowacki (commander – kpt. Andrzej Podgórski)
- Training armoured trains:
  - Zagończyk
  - Stefan Czarniecki
- Improvised armoured trains:
  - Two of Coast Defence Command (Dowództo Obrony Wybrzeża):
    - ? (commander – por. Z. Budzyński)
    - Smok Kaszubski (commander – kpt. mar. Jerzy Tadeusz Błeszyński, and after he got wounded, por. F. Hubicki)
  - Two of Warsaw Defence Command (Dowództwo Obrony Warszawy):
    - nr 1
    - nr 2

=== Polish armoured trains in United Kingdom (1940-1943) ===
- I dywizjon – trains: C, G, E
- II dywizjon – trains: A, D, F
- III dywizjon – trains: B, M, H
- IV dywizjon – trains: Nr 10, 11, 12 renamed in 1941 to K, L, J

=== Armoured trains of Railway Defence Service (Służba Ochrony Kolei, SOK) after 1945 ===
- nr 1 Szczecin
- nr 2 Grom
- nr 3 Huragan
- nr 4 Błyskawica

Retired from service after 1950.

=== Train artillery ===
- On the basis of German armoured train in 1947 a train artillery division DAKOL was formed.

=== Surviving units ===
- armoured wagon (likely from nr 11 Poznańczyk) in Poznań
- heavy armoured handcar PT16 (Panzertriebwagen 16) in Muzeum Kolejnictwa w Warszawie.

== Republika Srpska Krajina ==
- Krajina express

The Serb army of Krajina used an armoured train with M-18 and a AA cannon M-55 20/3mm

== Russia ==
- Zaamurets (also known as Orlík, BP-4, Lenin and Train No. 105 at various points during its operational career)
- Khunkhuz
- General Annenkov
- Yenisei
- Volga
- Amur
- Baikal
- Terek
- Don

== Slovakia ==
- Štefánik
- Hurban
- Masaryk

== United Kingdom ==
=== World War II ===
13 armoured trains were formed in June 1940 for coastal defence. They were typically formed by a small locomotive between two armoured wagons, usually small steel coal wagons with extra armour, and other wagons carrying ammunition. Each armoured wagon carried a mounted QF 6 pounder Hotchkiss gun and a Vickers machine gun or Lewis Gun. The infantry section on each wagon was also armed with a variety of small arms including Bren light machine guns, Thompson submachine guns and Lee–Enfield rifles. With the threat of invasion over, armoured trains were disbanded in November 1944.

The trains were initially operated by Royal Engineers crews and armoured wagons were manned by Royal Armoured Corps troops. From late 1940 until 1942 they were operated by railway company crews and armoured wagons were manned by troops of the Polish Armed Forces in the West. From 1942 they were operated by Home Guard units, composed of employees of the railway companies, until they were disbanded in November 1944.

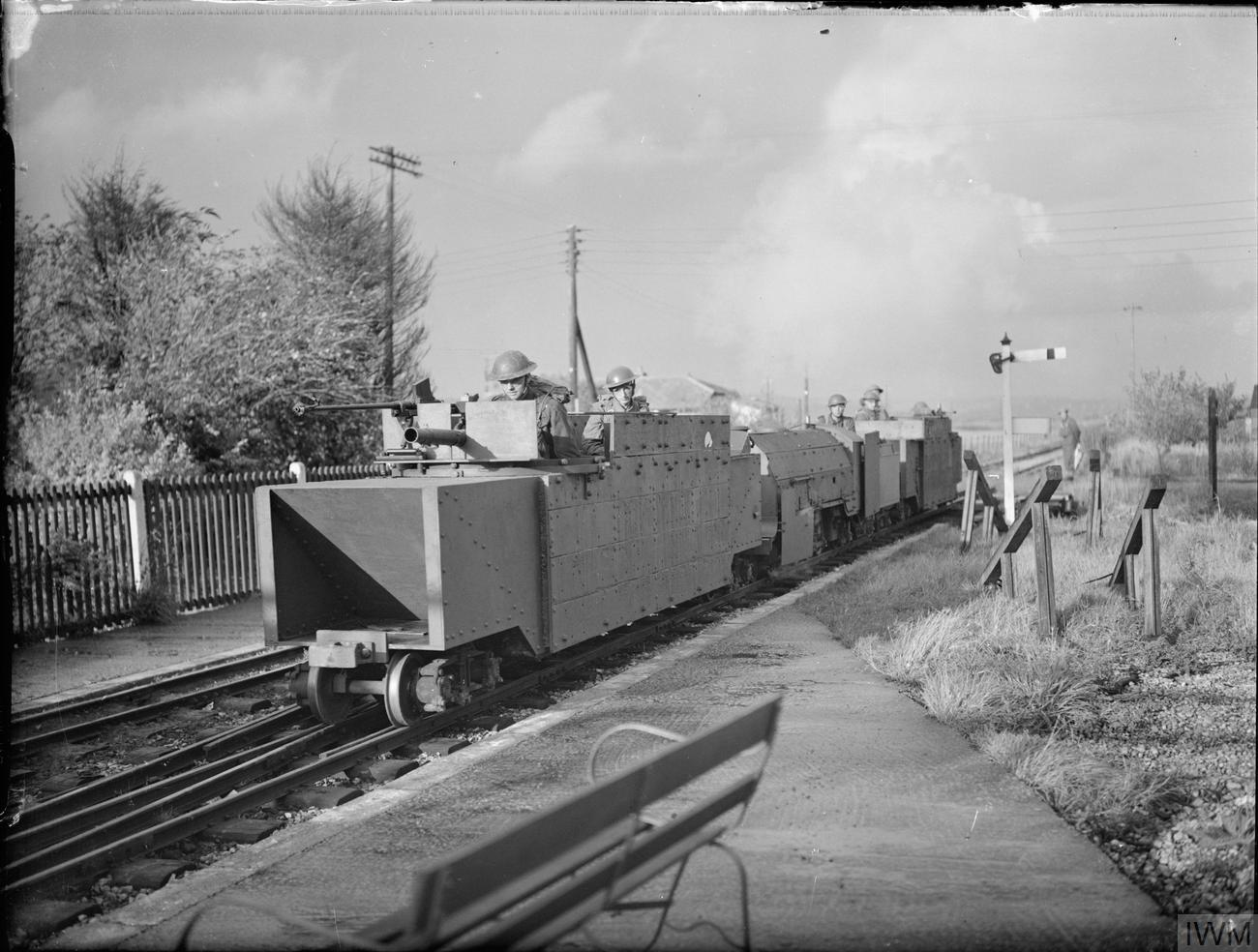
Romney, Hythe and Dymchurch armoured train, October 1940

The narrow gauge Romney, Hythe and Dymchurch Railway also had a miniature armoured train. Due to its small size it could not carry Hotchkiss guns and instead carried two Boys anti-tank rifles and four Lewis guns. It was manned by the 6th Battalion, Somerset Light Infantry and credited with shooting down a Messerschmitt Bf 109, a Heinkel He 111 and a Dornier Do 17.

=== Royal train ===
Armoured saloons were constructed by the London, Midland and Scottish Railway for King George VI and his wife Queen Elizabeth in 1941.

=== Battle of Malaya ===
In Malaya in 1942, an armoured train was part of Operation Krohcol, the British advance into Siam to resist the Japanese attack.

== United States ==
At least one armored diesel locomotive was built by Alco as #10001 for use during the First World War. However, with the Armistice 14 days away when it was ready, it never left the country.

While not a train intended for fighting, between 1957 and 1987 the United States Department of Energy operated the armored "White Train" carrying nuclear warheads between the Pantex Plant near Amarillo, Texas and various nuclear weapons storage facilities and US Navy submarine bases in the United States. The train consisted of flat cars with armored covers built by Thrall Car Manufacturing Company in 1957 and 1960, armored guard escort cars rebuilt from US Army hospital train kitchen cars that had been built by the St. Louis Car Company in 1953, plus power, support and buffer cars. Locomotives were supplied by the carrying railroad, commonly the Atchison, Topeka & Santa Fe or Burlington Northern. The armored escort cars had elevated observation cupolas with gun ports and carried armed security couriers from the Office of Secure Transportation. Each train was assigned two or three armored escort cars. The train's cars were initially painted white, but individual cars were subsequently repainted into different colors to make them less conspicuous and frustrate anti-war demonstrators, who began tracking the train in order to blockade its progress, however it continued to be known as the White Train. The train was withdrawn from service in 1987, replaced by highway vehicles and newer rail cars that could be marshalled into any freight train. Some of the White Train cars are preserved at the Amarillo Railroad Museum, while a few others are preserved at the Pantex Plant.
