= Śmiały =

Smialy may refer to:

- Bolesław II Śmiały (ca. 1041 or 1042–1081 or 1082), Duke of Poland
- Śmiały (armoured train), Polish armoured train used by the Polish Army during the German Invasion of Poland in 1939
