= Piłsudczyk =

Piłsudczyk may refer to:

== Person ==
- Piłsudskiite, a supporter of Poland's Marshal Józef Piłsudski during the early twentieth century

== Vehicle ==
- Piłsudczyk (armoured train), a Polish armed train of the early twentieth century
