= QF 6-pounder 6 cwt Hotchkiss =

QF 6 pounder 6 cwt Hotchkiss Mk 1 - 2
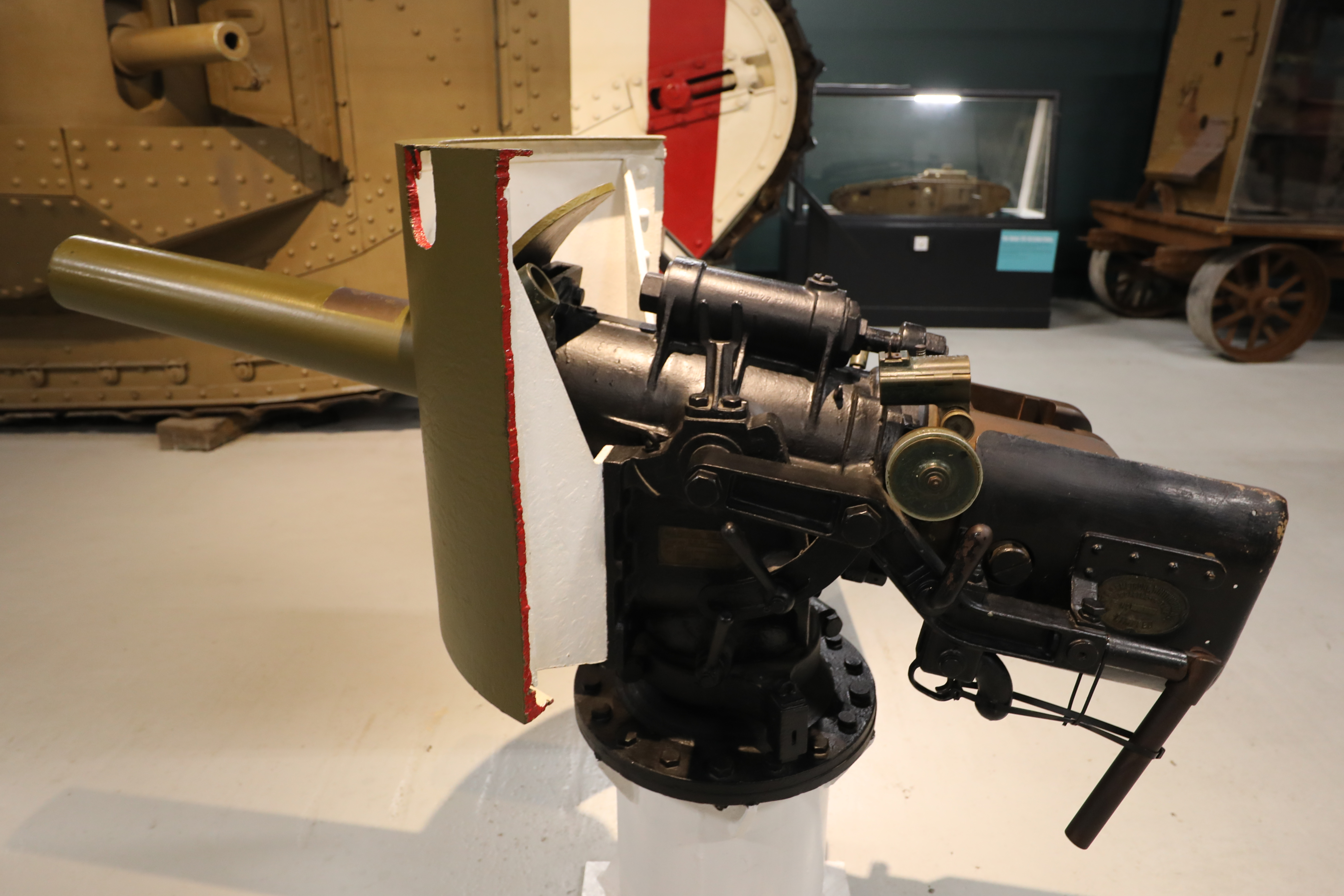
- QF 6 pounder 6 cwt Hotchkiss used for gunnery training
- Type: Tank gun, armoured train gun
- Place of origin: United Kingdom

Service history
- In service: 1917–1944
- Used by: United Kingdom
- Wars: World War I, World War II

Production history
- Designer: Hotchkiss

Specifications
- Barrel length: Bore: 52.12 inch (1.32 m) 23 calibres Total: 60 inch (1.52 m)
- Shell: Fixed QF, HE (57 x 306R)
- Calibre: 2.244 in (57 mm)
- Breech: Vertical sliding block
- Recoil: Hydro-spring
- Muzzle velocity: 1,350 ft/s (411 m/s)
- Effective firing range: 7,300 yards (6,675 m)

The Ordnance QF 6-pounder 6 cwt Hotchkiss Mk I and Mk II was a shortened version of the original QF 6 pounder Hotchkiss naval gun, and was developed specifically for use in the sponsons of the later marks of British tanks in World War I, from Mark IV onwards.

== History ==
=== World War I ===
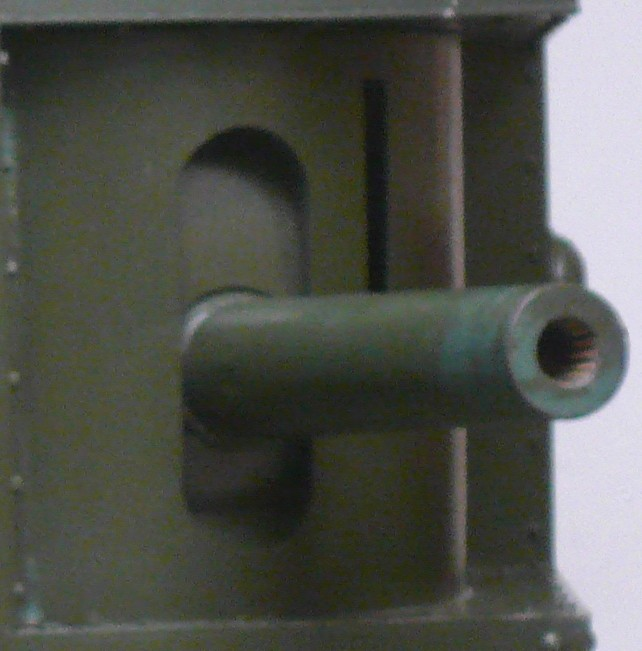
Closeup of Mk I gun in Mk V tank at Imperial War Museum London

The original QF 6 pounder naval gun had turned out to be too long for practical use with the current British heavy tank designs, which mounted guns in sponsons on the side rather than turrets on top as modern tanks do. The muzzles of the long barrels sometimes dug into the mud or struck obstacles when the vehicle crossed trenches or shell craters. The shortened QF 6 pounder 6 cwt Mk I of single tube construction was introduced in January 1917 in the Mark IV tank, and may be considered the world's first specialised tank gun.

The shortened barrel incurred a reduction in muzzle velocity, but as tank guns in World War I were used against unarmoured or lightly armoured targets such as machine gun nests and artillery pieces at relatively short ranges of a few hundred yards, this was not a major disadvantage.

The Mk II gun was developed at the same time, having a built-up barrel construction.

=== World War II ===
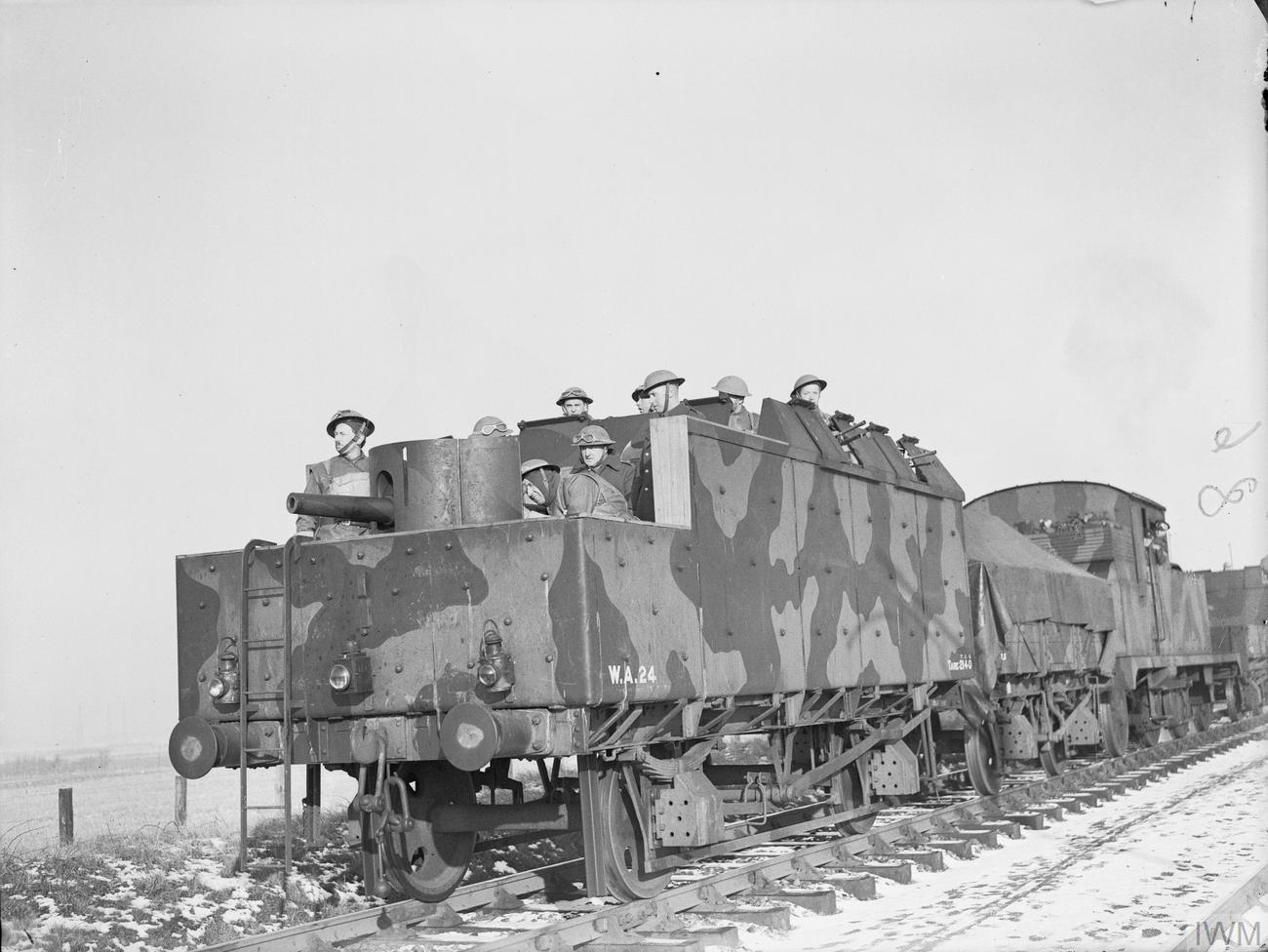
Polish troops manning an armoured train with a 6-pounder in its original tank mounting at the end, Scotland February 1941

The gun was reused in the Second World War, being fitted to the 12 Armoured Trains operated in the United Kingdom. Just as with the tank mounting, the short barrel was an advantage, preventing fouling of line-side structures and bridges. The last British armoured trains (in Scotland) were decommissioned in 1944.

In 1940 as part of the British anti-invasion preparations, a large number of pillboxes were built to a design, known as Type 28 or FW3/28, intended for the modern 2-pounder anti-tank gun. However, as these were in desperately short supply, 6-pounder Hotchkiss guns firing solid shot were used instead. Unlike the 2-pounder which could be wheeled into the pillbox on its carriage, a holdfast was incorporated into the floor to which a pedestal mounting could be bolted. It is unlikely that many of these emplacements were permanently armed, but the guns were held in reserve until required.

== See also ==
- List of tank main guns

== Bibliography ==
- I.V. Hogg and L.F. Thurston, British Artillery Weapons & Ammunition 1914–1918. London: Ian Allan, 1972. ISBN 978-0-7110-0381-1
