= Polish armoured train units in Britain =

Polish armoured trains in Britain
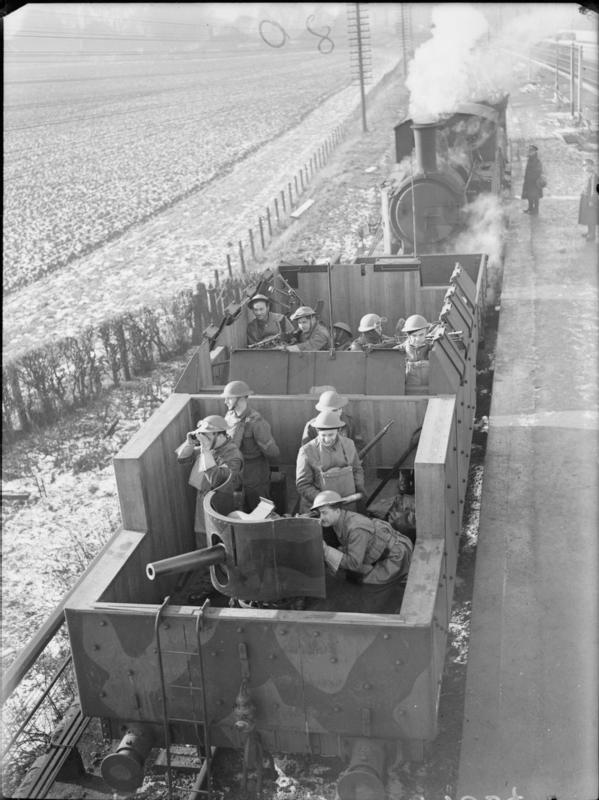
- Polish troops in armoured train UK 1941. Ref: IWM H 7034
- In service: 1940–1943-4
- Manufacturer: Derby Carriage and Wagon Works and LNER
- Number built: 12

During World War II, 12 Polish armoured trains in Britain were manned, from October 1940 until 1942, by the Polish Armed Forces in the West. They were assigned to patrol the British railways in 1940. They saw no combat and were disbanded in England by July 1943 (November 1944 in Scotland).

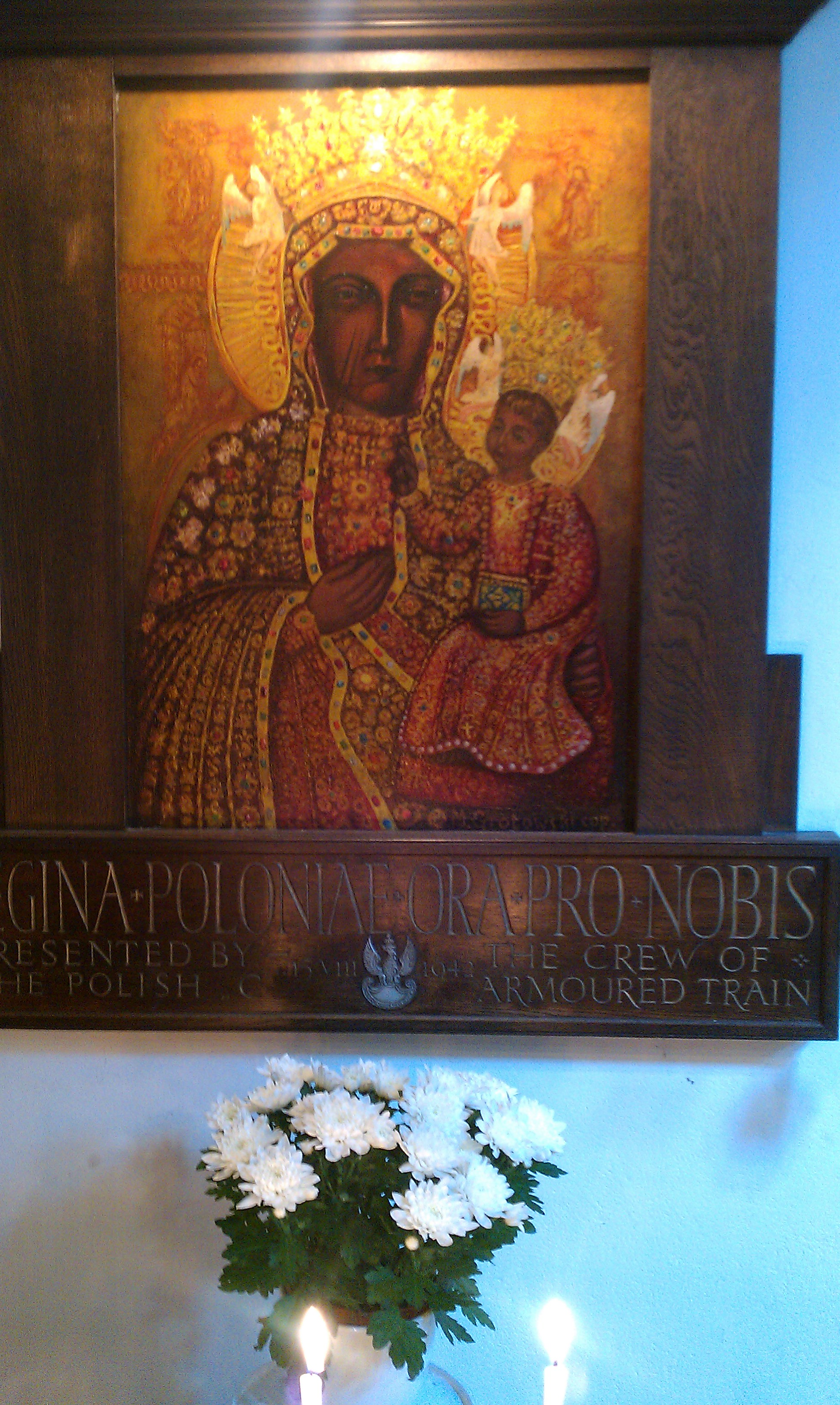
An icon donated by Polish armoured train C to St. Pancras Church, Ipswich

The trains were built in the Derby Carriage and Wagon Works and the LNER works at Stratford in London. They patrolled the British coast from Cornwall up to the Moray Firth in Scotland. These included the only miniature railway armoured train ever created on the Romney, Hythe and Dymchurch Railway.

The armoured trains were formed in July 1940 as part of the preparations to face a German invasion; these were initially armed with QF 6 pounder 6 cwt Hotchkiss guns and six Bren Guns, by Royal Engineer crews and manned by Royal Armoured Corps troops.

The Polish Armoured Train battalions were founded on 12 October 1940. In late 1940 preparations began to hand the trains over to the Polish Army and expand the rolling stock used.

== Battalions ==
There were four separate battalions formed, each assigned to a set of armoured trains:

- 1st Battalion (Polish: I dywizjon) operated trains: C, G and E,
- 2nd Battalion (II dywizjon) – trains: A, D and F,
- 3rd Battalion (III dywizjon) – trains: B, M and H,
- 4th Battalion (IV dywizjon) – trains: K, L and J (formerly # 10, 11, 12).

The Polish units operated them until 1942 when the trains were handed to the Home Guard. They were quite soon phased out in England, but three continued to be used in Scotland, until the last one was withdrawn in November 1944.

== See also ==
- Armoured trains of Poland
