= Gromobój (armoured train) =

Polish armoured train

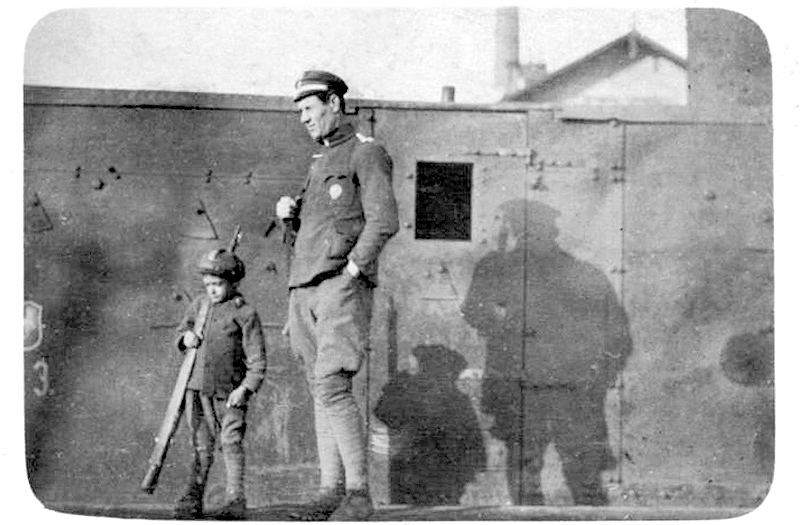
Polish soldier in front of the armoured train Gromobój in Sanok 1918.

Gromobój was a Polish improvised armoured train from the period of the Polish-Ukrainian war (1918-1919). The train took part in the fighting in the area of the rail junction in Zagórz. The train's armour was constructed from walls of brick, between which was river gravel. The locomotive used in the train was an ex-Austro-Hungarian kkStB Class 229.

== See also ==
- List of armoured trains
