= Piłsudczyk (armoured train) =

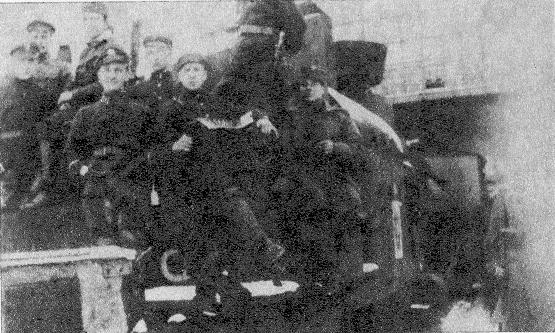
"Piłsudczyk" and its crew during the Polish-Ukrainian War

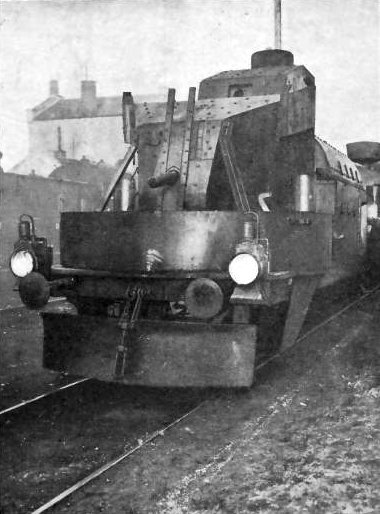
Austro-Hungarian V-type artillery car, used in 1920

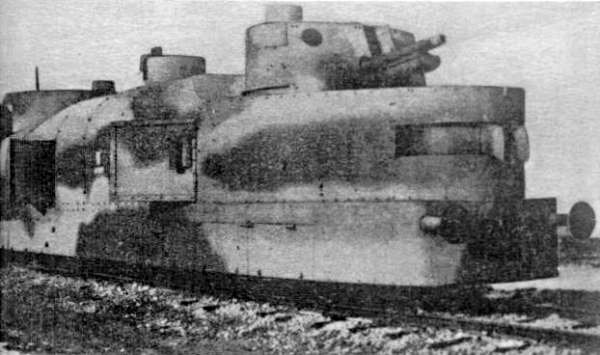
Standard Polish artillery car of the 1930s, used in "Piłsudczyk", Danuta and Śmiały

Piłsudczyk (Polish pronunciation: [piwˈsutt͡ʂɨk], pron. Peewsudchyk) was a Polish armoured train of the early 20th century. It was among the first armoured trains serving the Polish Army and took part in the Polish-Ukrainian War of 1918-1919, the subsequent Polish-Soviet War and the Silesian Uprisings. Kept in reserve during the inter-war years, it was mobilised again in 1939 to be used during the Nazi-Soviet Invasion of Poland. "Piłsudczyk" was destroyed by its crew on 20 September 1939 at the train station at Mrozy.

In early November 1918, during the final collapse of Austria-Hungary, Polish troops captured an intact Austro-Hungarian train at the station in Prokocim near Kraków. It consisted of two modern artillery cars, two infantry cars and one assault car. The train was quickly split into two distinct armoured trains: "Piłsudczyk", named in honour of the Polish Commander-in-Chief Józef Piłsudski, and Śmiały. Both were then accepted into the new Polish Army and took part in the Battle of Lwów, where they were crucial in lifting the Ukrainian siege of the city.

In 1921 the crew of the train took part in the 3rd Silesian Uprising, among others in the battle of Kędzierzyn, where casualties reached 20% of the crew. After the war the train was refurbished and attached to the armoured train school, and then in 1927 to the Niepołomice-based 2nd Armoured Train Squadron. Because the train was used for the training of recruits, it was kept in a "ready and fighting" condition at all times. By 1939 it was upgraded and extended to include as follows:

- armoured locomotive (hull number 377.402)
- assault car with radio
- 2 artillery cars
- 2 platforms

"Piłsudczyk" was armed with two ex-Russian armata wz. 02/26 guns, two ex-Austro-Hungarian 100mm Haubica wz. 1914/1919 howitzers and 19 heavy machine guns, and was reinforced with a TK-3 tankette and a Renault FT tank (both refitted as draisines).

Mobilised on 25 August 1939 in preparation for invasion by Nazi Germany, the train was additionally refitted with another unarmoured engine, and then attached for armed operations, to the Army Łódź, to reinforce the 30th Infantry Division in the area of Działoszyn. Following the outbreak of World War II the train fended off numerous attacks by German aviation but the destruction of Poland's rail lines prevented the train from reaching the front line. It was then withdrawn to Widawa and then to Łask, where it was attached to the 28th Infantry Division. The train was then used for patrolling the rails in the vicinity of Łódź, being able to fend off many more air attacks. On 6 September it withdrew towards Warsaw with a special mission of escorting a transport of gold deposits from the banks of Poznań. It reached the capital on September 8.

Attached to the Wyszków Operational Group, the train operated near Legionowo, Tłuszcz, Rembertów, Mińsk Mazowiecki and Siedlce. As the German motorised units outflanked the Polish defenders and captured both Mińsk and Siedlce, the train was caught in the resulting traffic jam in a large operational "cauldron" to the east of Warsaw. Encircled by the Germans in the same "cauldron" were the supply train of Generał Sosnkowski, the 17th Railway Company and 17 different evacuation trains. An ad-hoc battle group was formed by the crews of the trains and commanded by Col. Mikołaj Prus-Więckowski, who defended the area. Unable to escape encirclement, the train patrolled the Sosnowe-Mrozy line, where it defeated numerous German attacks. However, in a skirmish on 17 September one of the artillery cars was knocked out and in the evening had to leave the town of Mrozy. The following day the crew retook the town from the Germans, but in a reverse on 19 September the assault car was lost too. Cut off from Polish lines, by 20 September the train had only one gun and 3 machine guns operational, and no more than 6 shells for the single artillery piece. The train had to be abandoned at Mrozy and was destroyed by its crew so as not to fall into German or Soviet hands. Later, armoured train was captured by Soviet NKVD troops, repaired, and put in service as NKVD armoured train №77 http://nkvd.borda.ru/?1-17-0-00000028-000-0-0-1158599937

The crew of "Piłsudczyk" tried unsuccessfully to reach Warsaw on foot, but joined the Independent Operational Group Polesie instead, and fought-on against the Germans and Soviets until the battle of Kock, at the end of the Polish defensive war of 1939.
