= Railway Security Guard =

Polish police organization

Railway Security Guard Straż Ochrony Kolei
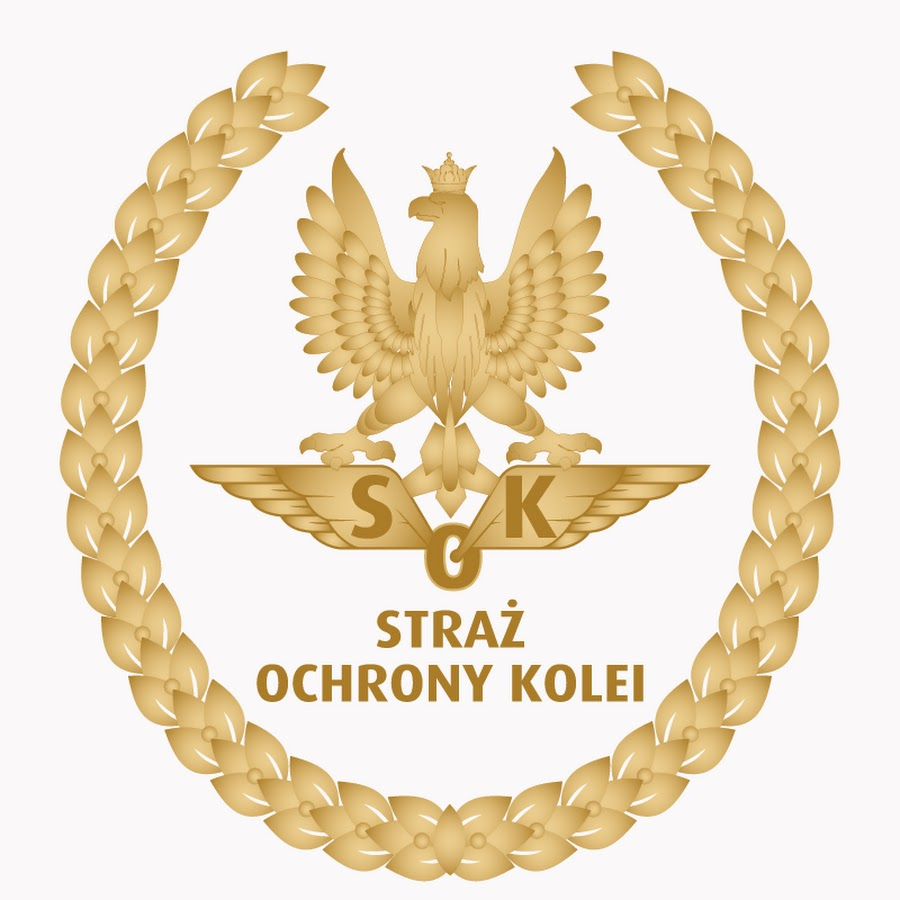
- Emblem of the Railway Security Guard

Jurisdictional structure
- Operations jurisdiction: Poland
- Legal jurisdiction: Poland

Operational structure
- Headquarters: Warsaw

Website
- kgsok.pl

The Railway Security Guard (Polish: Straż Ochrony Kolei, SOK) is a Polish uniformed militarized government organization, that operates as a railroad police.

Founded on 18 November 1918, the Railway Security Guard has been incorporated into the structures of Polish railway infrastructure manager PKP Polskie Linie Kolejowe since 1 October 2001.

== History ==
On 18 November 1918, at the request of the Warsaw Railway Directorate, the Ministry of Railways established the Railway Guard, headed by Emil Rauer, president of the 1st District of the Warsaw Land "Sokół". The formation was designated to secure property, maintain public safety, law and order, and protect travelers and their property.

On 28 April 1919, in agreement with the Minister of Railways, the Railway Guard was subordinated to the Minister of Military Affairs for the duration of the war. From that moment on, the guard became part of the Polish Army. The guard's previous tasks were supplemented by the protection of military transports and the protection of railway facilities of military importance. The name of the formation was later changed to the Military Railway Guard. During the Second Polish Republic until 1939, the Union of Former Participants of the Military Railway Guard of the Republic of Poland operated. After less than a year, on 1 February 1920, this formation was disbanded, and all matters were transferred to the State Police. This situation lasted for 14 years, and at the same time there was a significant increase in crime in the railway area. To remedy this, the Railway Protection Guard was organized by the Act of 15 April 1934 on the Protection of Order on Public Railways.

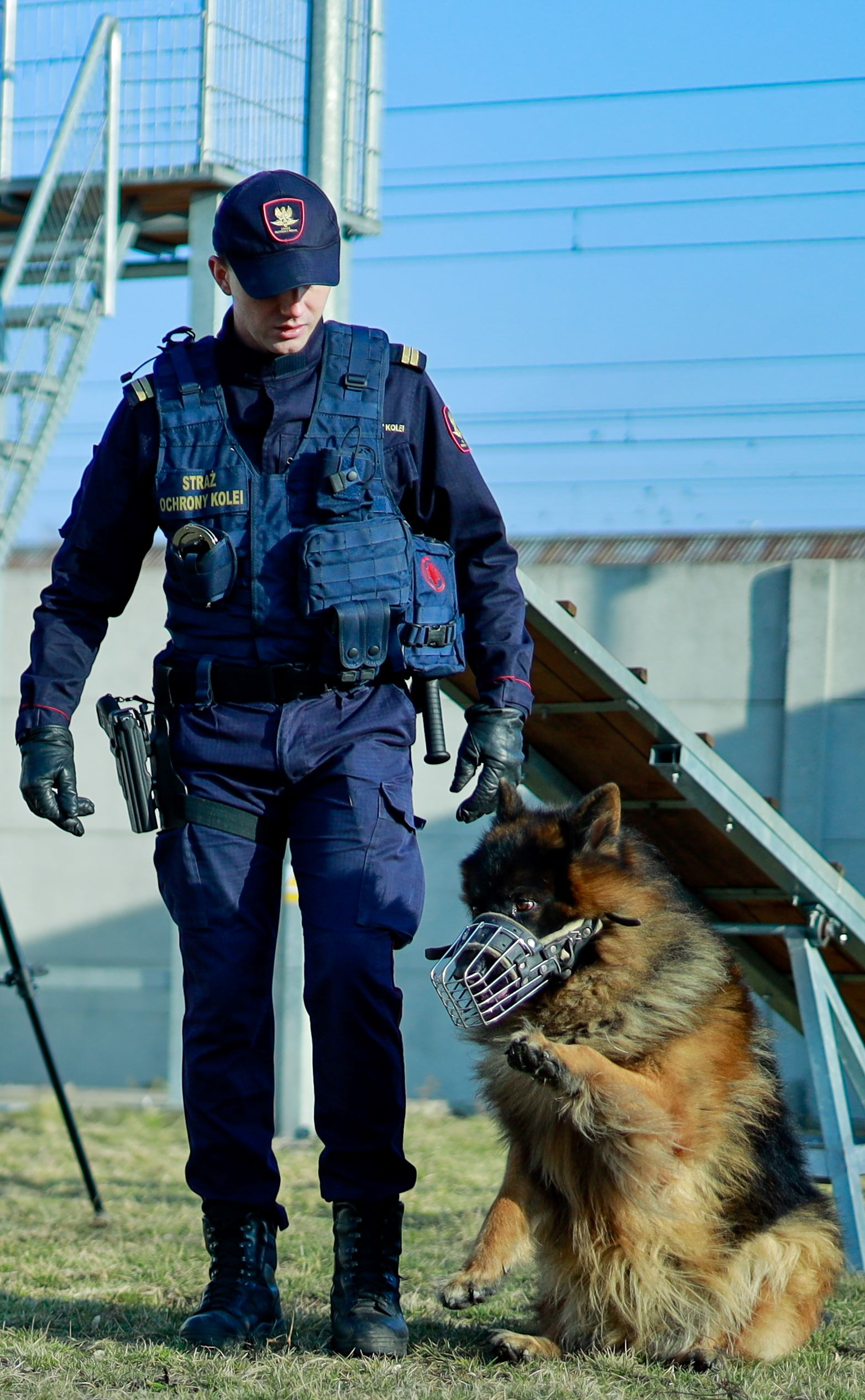
Railway guard with a dog

On 25 July 1939, the Minister of Communication issued a decree transforming the SOK into the Railway Guard. Due to the outbreak of World War II, it did not come into effect.

On 22 July 1944, the Polish Committee of National Liberation established the Ministry of Communication, Posts and Telegraphs, which also included the state railways. Based on the pre-war decree, they created the Railway Protection Service. In 1955, the formation was reorganized. The Railway Protection Service was dissolved, and its place, for 5 years, was taken over by the Railway Guard, which dealt only with the protection of railway property and entrusted railways. The Railway Citizens' Militia, established in the same year, took over other tasks of the former Railway Protection Service. In 1960, the Railway Protection Service was re-established on the basis of the Railway Act In 1982, operational units of the Railway Protection Service were established. These units operated until 1992.

The next reorganization of the Railway Protection Service took place in 1997 on the basis of the Railway Transport Act. The name of the Railway Protection Service was restored to the formation, the uniform was changed to the military model, the Main Headquarters of the Railway Protection Service was organizationally separated and within it district and regional units. In October 2001, as part of the transformations carried out in PKP, the Railway Protection Service was incorporated into the structures of the company PKP Polskie Linie Kolejowe S.A., while maintaining the organizational independence of the service.

As of 30 June 2015, the Main Headquarters of the Railway Protection Guard employed 3,049 people, including 2,866 Railway Protection Guard officers (706 administrative officers and 2,160 operational officers) and 183 civilian employees.

== Duties ==
Its primary functions are:

- Maintaining law and order within the railroad territory and in railway transport
- Guarding life and health safety, as well as property security.

From 7 December 2022 onwards, the formation belongs to the structure of the European Railway Police Organization Railpol.

== Rank badges ==
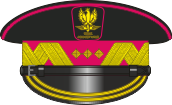
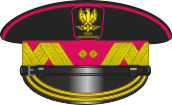
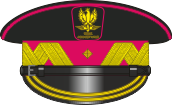
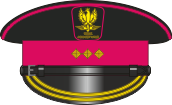
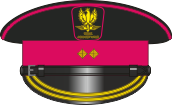
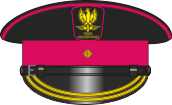
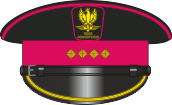
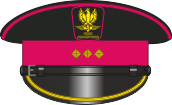
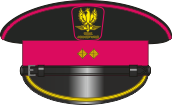
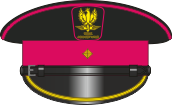
| Rank group | General / flag officers | | | | Senior officers | | | Junior officers |
| | | Generals | | | Senior officers | | | Junior officers |
|---|---|---|---|---|---|---|---|---|---|---|---|
| Railway Police (SOK) | No equivalent |
| Railway Police (SOK) | No equivalent | Commander HQ SOK | Deputy commander HQ SOK for operations | Deputy commander HQ SOK for economy | Commander regional HQ SOK | Assistant commander regional HQ SOK | Senior inspector SOK | Division manager, Regional HQ SOK | Inspector SOK | Station commander SOK | Assistant station commander SOK |

Other

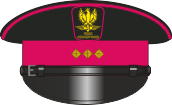
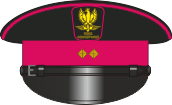
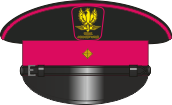
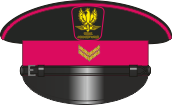
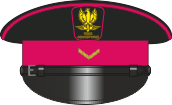
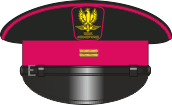
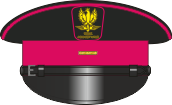
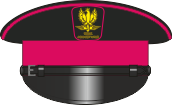
| Rank group | Senior NCOs | | | | | Junior NCOs | Enlisted |
| | | | | | | | | Trainee |
|---|---|---|---|---|---|---|---|---|
| Railway Police (SOK) |
| Railway Police (SOK) | Watch commander SOK | Duty officer SOK | Squad leader SOK | Senior team leader SOK | Team leader SOK | Senior officer SOK | Officer SOK | Trainee SOK |
