= ORP Nurek =

Polish diver depot ship

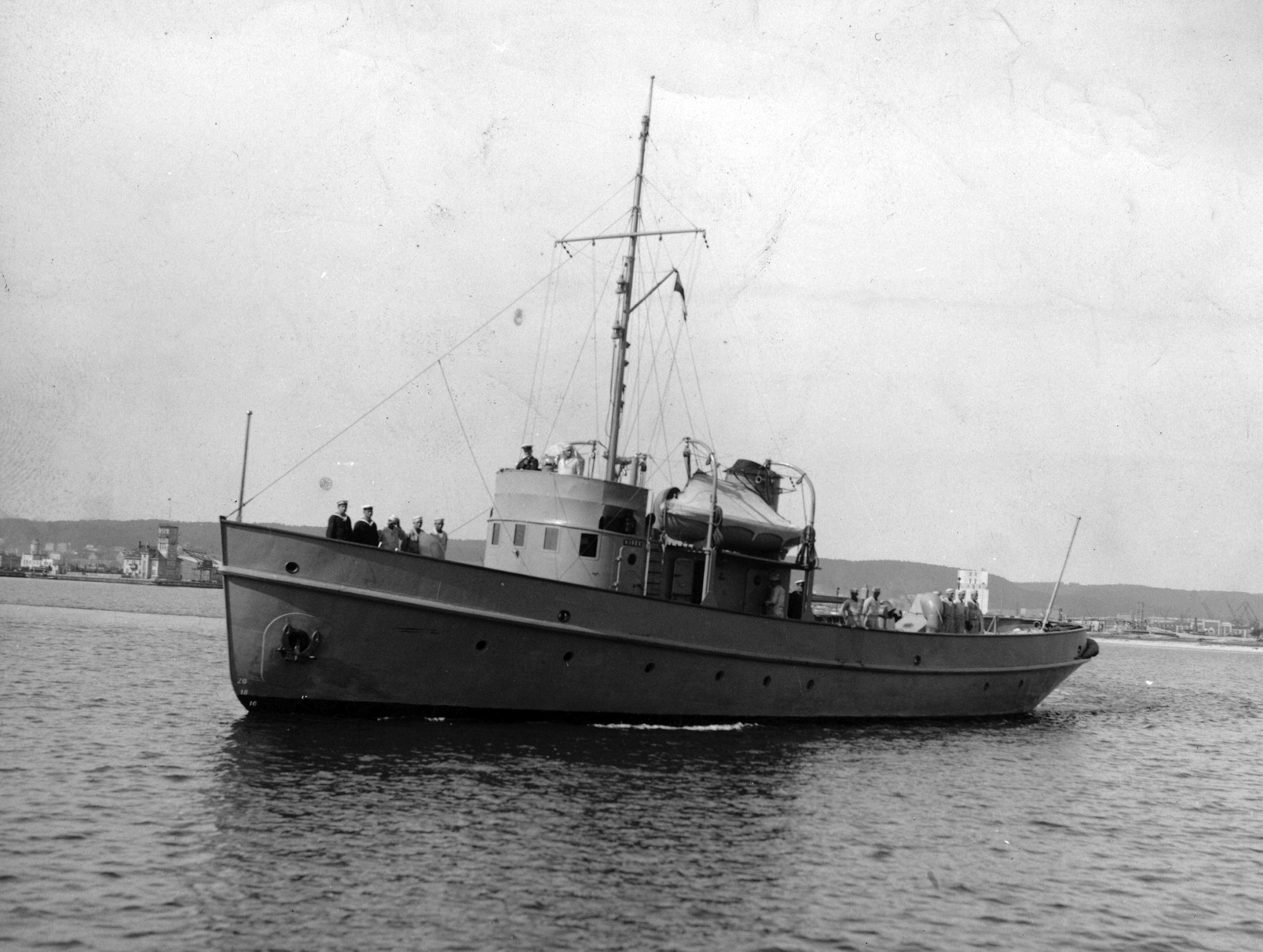

History

Polish Navy (Second Polish Republic)
- Name: ORP Nurek
- Builder: Polish Navy Shipyard
- Laid down: 1935
- Launched: November 1, 1936
- Out of service: September 1, 1939
- Fate: sunk

General characteristics
- Class & type: depot ship
- Displacement: 110 t (240,000 lb)
- Length: 29 m (95 ft)
- Draft: 1.4 m (4.6 ft)
- Propulsion: 1 Nohab 4DG diesel engine with 260 hp
- Speed: 10 kn (19 km/h; 12 mph)
- Range: 150 nmi (280 km; 170 mi)
- Complement: between 19 and 21 officers and sailors
- Armament: 2 MG 08 machine guns, caliber 7.92 mm

ORP Nurek was a Polish diver depot ship from the interwar period and the beginning of World War II. Built at the Polish Navy Shipyard in Gdynia, it was commissioned in 1936 as a diver support and rescue and salvage ship, particularly for submarines. It participated in the construction of the ports in Hel and Władysławowo. The ship was bombed and sunk on September 1 in the Port of Gdynia; the wreck was salvaged by the Germans and scrapped.

== Origins and construction ==
From the early 1930s, there was rapid quantitative and qualitative growth in the navy. The commissioning of three Wilk-class submarines, which formed the Submarine Division in 1931, particularly highlighted the need for a modern auxiliary unit capable of performing maritime rescue tasks. The aged motorboat Nurek, which had served as a diver support vessel since the mid-1920s, was technically inadequate for these new tasks.

The prospect of constructing additional submarines led the technical service of the Polish Navy Command to prepare preliminary designs for a depot ship by mid-1934. These designs primarily differed in engine type (with proposed power ranging from 160 to 280 hp), size (maximum length of 30 m), and displacement (90 to 120 t). Ultimately, all these designs were rejected in favor of a completely different project developed by engineer Aleksander Potyrała. The ship was to have a hull made of steel joined by a welding joint, a technology not previously used by the builder – the Polish Navy Shipyard in Gdynia. A different technology was used for the superstructure, which was made of brass joined by riveting. For propulsion, a modified Nohab engine from the Jaskółka-class minesweepers was used, with a power of 260 hp, which was half the power of the original Nohab engine due to the reduction in the number of cylinders from 8 to 4.

Construction of the unit, with the shipyard number B6, began in the Polish Navy Shipyard in Gdynia in the second half of 1935. By March 1936, the engine was ready, and on 2 July 1936 (while still under construction), the Minister of Military Affairs named it ORP Nurek. Construction was completed in the autumn of 1936. The total cost of construction amounted to 230,000 PLN.

== Description ==
ORP Nurek had a length overall of 29 m, a waterline length of 26 m, a maximum width of 6 m, and a draft of 1.4 m with a standard displacement of 110 t. The vessel's smooth-decked hull was constructed from ship steel and entirely welded. The superstructure was located amidships. The ship was powered by a four-cylinder Nohab 4 DG diesel engine, produced under license from the Swedish company Nyquist-Holm at the Ursus Engine and Fittings Factory. The 260 hp engine, running on gas oil, drove a single propeller. The engine's power allowed for a maximum speed of 10 knots. The ship had a range of 150 nautical miles. The crew varied from 19 to 22 people over different periods.

Specialized equipment included a Polish-designed diving chamber, intended to prevent decompression sickness in divers who surfaced too quickly, and for submarine crew members who evacuated using individual rescue devices from submerged or sunken submarines.

ORP Nurek was also equipped with diving gear, an air diving pump, a 3-ton capacity folding steel derrick, towing equipment, two lifeboats, and a radio communication station. The ship's design did not initially include armament; however, in 1939, two MG 08 machine guns, caliber 7.92 mm, were installed on the bow and stern for anti-aircraft defense.

== Service ==
Upon completion of construction, the Minister of Military Affairs incorporated the auxiliary vessel ORP Nurek into the fleet of Poland on 1 November 1936. The ship was included in the floating equipment of the Gdynia-Oksywie Naval Port Command. The first commander of ORP Nurek, Lieutenant Wacław Lipkowski, was appointed on 1 October 1936. At the beginning of its service, the vessel had poor stability, which hindered underwater work. This defect was corrected by relocating masses within the hull. During its three years of service, the divers from ORP Nurek participated in the construction of the naval port in Hel and the fishing port in Władysławowo. They carried out the cleaning of the Głębinka Canal and several operations in Gdynia Naval Port. In 1938, the divers took part in underwater archaeological research in Biskupin. On 20 January 1938, Lieutenant Lipkowski was replaced as ship commander by Warrant Officer Wincenty Tomasiewicz, who commanded the vessel until the outbreak of the war.

Ship commanders
Lieutenant Wacław Lipkowski	1 October 1936	20 January 1938
Warrant Officer Wincenty Tomasiewicz	20 January 1938	1 September 1939

Before the outbreak of the war, the ship was subordinated to the Commander of the Maritime Coastal Defense in Hel. It sailed from Gdynia to Hel, transporting provisions and armaments. On 1 September 1939, the unit was in the Gdynia Naval Port. On that day, the ship was supposed to transport gyroscopes and detonators from the torpedo depot to Hel. Before departing for Hel, the commander awaited the delivery of documents from the Gdynia Naval Port captaincy, brought by Bosun Witold Sierko. At 2:00 PM, 32 German Junkers Ju 87B Stuka dive bombers from the IV.(St)/LG 1 squadron flew over the port and bombed the units located there. One of the 250 kg SC 250 bombs hit the ORP Nurek's smokestack directly, destroying the midsection. The hull and superstructure were torn apart. As a result of the explosion, the vessel was thrown about 25 m from the pier to the middle of the port basin, where it immediately sank. 16 out of the 22 crew members perished on board, including the commander, Wincenty Tomasiewicz. The 17th victim of the raid, killed on ORP Nurek, was Bosun Sierko, who was not a member of its crew. 6 sailors survived, being thrown into the water by the blast. In October, after the end of hostilities, the Germans salvaged the wreck but, finding it uneconomical to repair, decided to scrap it.
