= Groźny (armoured train) =

Polish armoured train

The armoured train Groźny (Polish for Dangerous) also known as PP 54 and Armoured Train number 54 was an armoured train of the Polish Army that saw action during German Invasion of Poland in September 1939 and later in German service with portions of it seeing service on the Eastern Front and the occupation of France. It was originally captured about 1919–20 from the Soviet Union in the Polish-Soviet War.

== History ==
=== Invasion of Poland ===
Assigned to Operational Group "Śląsk" (Polish for Silesia), the Groźny saw service against the 3rd Infantry Division near Orzesze on the morning of 1 September 1939.

It then patrolled the rail line between Tychy and Kobiór, where the 23rd Division was attempting to pass. In the evening it helped the Polish II/73 Battalion (2nd battalion of the 73rd Regiment, of the 23rd Division), defend west of Tychy, the area surrounding Wyry where it was attacked by German bombers, taking single dud bomb that bounced off.

On 2 September 1939, it supported the Polish I/73 infantry battalion and was part of the Polish assault in Wyry, attacking south down the Tychy-Kobiór rail line. The assault caused heavy losses on the German forces there. The train's assault platoon was used in an attack on a road to Żwaków which failed due to machine gun and mortar fire. Later in the day after harassing attacks the train's commander Captain Rybczyński was killed in the train's tankette while on reconnaissance. The command was subsequently taken up by Captain Józef Kulesza.

On 2 September 1939, it again engaged units on the Tychy-Kobiór rail line before withdrawing to Szczakowa.

On 4 September 1939 with the front collapsing, the train protected the right flank of the retreating Operational Group "Śląsk" (Now "Jagmin"), taking artillery fire, damaging the tender and injuring Captain Kulesza. According to some sources, it engaged a German motorized unit near Tunel and collided with its own tankette, destroying the tankette.

On 5 September 1939, the train's tankettes on a reconnaissance mission drove off a German motorized pioneer patrol of the 27th Division that was trying to destroy track near Wolbrom.

On 17 September 1939, the train was abandoned at Biadoliny station when the railway bridge was cut. Explosives were used to damage the train and removed the machine guns and gun breeches with the crew later linking up with either Strzelec Kresowy (PP 51) or Operational Group "Polesie"

=== Use by the German military ===
Its two artillery wagons were split up and formed part of the Panzerzug 21 and Panzerzug 22 with a 100mm howitzer & 75mm cannon and two 75mm cannons respectively. The Panzerzug 21 saw use on the Eastern Front (1940-1944) before being captured by the Red Army on 30 October 1944. The Panzerzug 22 saw use during the occupation of France (1941–1945) and the Eastern Front (1941–1944) before being destroyed on the 11 February 1945.

== See also ==
- Armoured trains of Poland
- List of armoured trains
