= Poznańczyk (armoured train) =

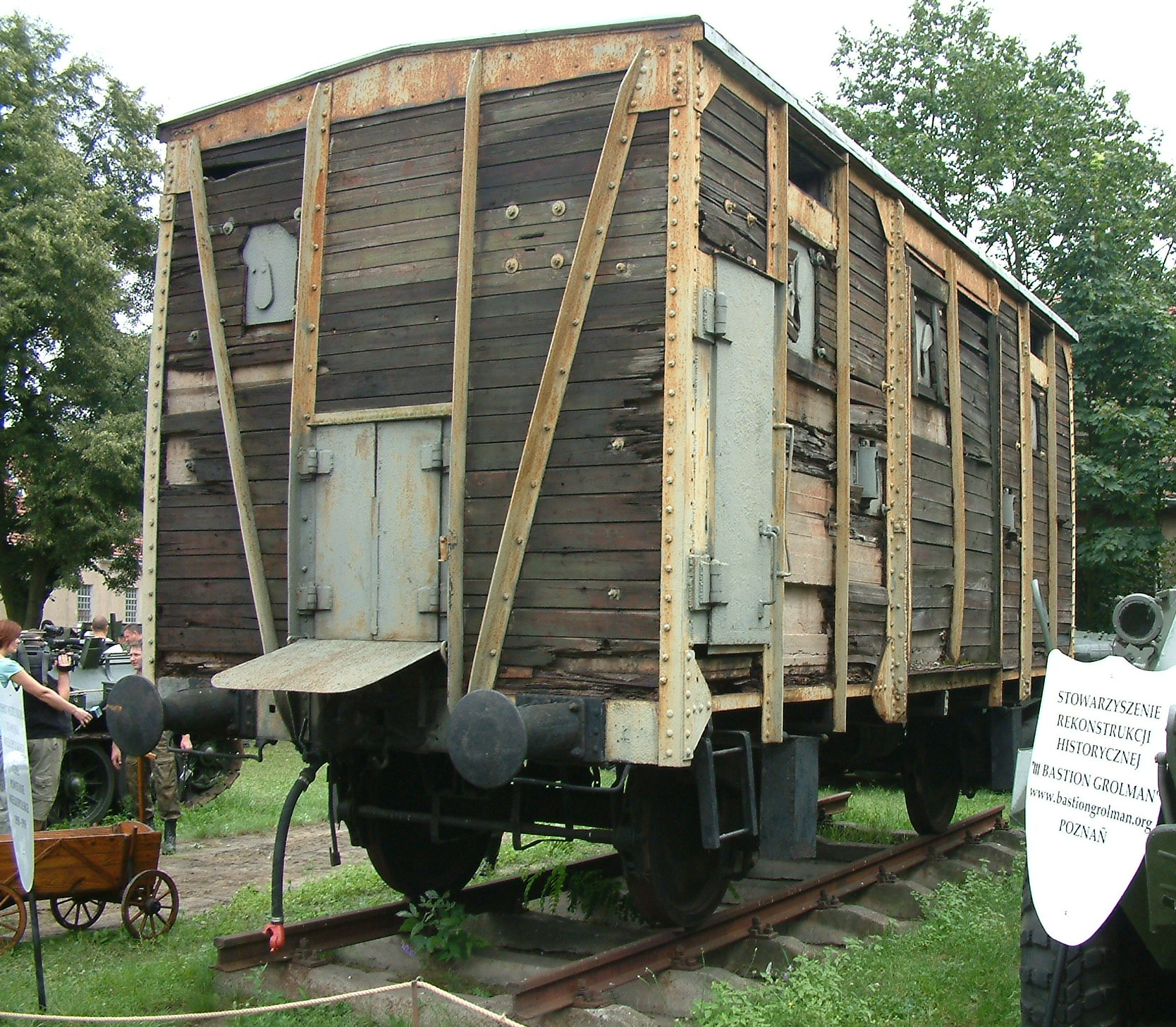
One of original 1918 cars of the first Poznańczyk is preserved in Poznań as a monument

Poznańczyk was a Polish armoured train which participated in the Greater Poland Uprising, the Polish–Soviet War and in the Second World War.

Built in December 1918 in Warsaw, it was originally an improvised armoured train consisting of cargo cars reinforced with concrete and sandbags, and armed with numerous machine guns. The train took part in battles of the Greater Poland Uprising, notably the capture of Ostrów Wielkopolski and Krotoszyn. In 1919 it was modernised at Hipolit Cegielski Works and received identical cars to those previously built for Danuta armoured train.

In December 1919 it was modified to Russian gauge and took part in the Polish-Bolshevist War. During the Battle of Warsaw it supported the 1st Legions Infantry Division. It then proceeded to fight near Vilna as part of the 2nd Army. In 1921 it was again withdrawn to Cegielski Works, where it was modernised and equipped with better armament. Demobilised in 1924, it served as a reserve train for armoured train school.

Mobilised again in 1939, it was attached to Poznań Army and took part in heavy fights near Krotoszyn, along Warta River, and then further east. Unable to withdraw towards Warsaw and cut off from Polish forces, the train's crew destroyed it and proceeded to fight on foot.

== See also ==
- List of armoured trains

== Bibliography ==
- Malmassari, Paul (2016) [1989]. Armoured Trains (2nd revised and expanded ed.). Barnsley, UK: Seaforth Publishing. ISBN 978-1-84832-262-2.
