= Bartosz Głowacki (armoured train) =

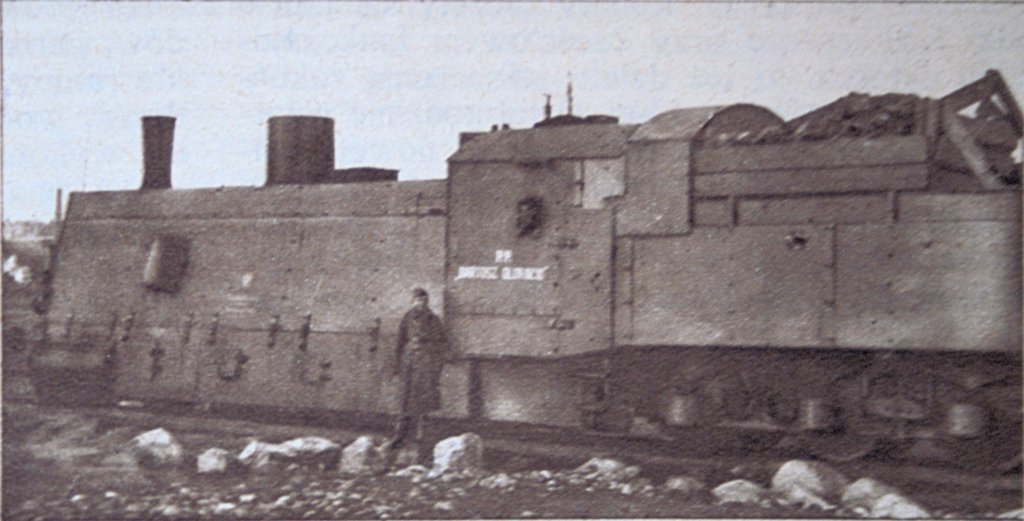
A 1920 photo of steam engine of the Bartosz Glowacki armoured train

Armoured Train Bartosz Glowacki, also called Armoured Train number 55 or PP 55 was a Polish Army armoured train, used during the Polish-Soviet War and the Polish September Campaign. On 11 September 1939, it was assigned to the Operational Group Wyszkow and was directed to the fortress of Brześć nad Bugiem, where it fought German units of the SS-Verfügungstruppe. After withdrawal southwards, to Lwów, it helped some of the Polish units cross the German lines, but needed to be recovered after the artillery and anti--tank guns of the 1st Mountain Division (Wehrmacht) heavily damaged it. The train might have been finished off by the Luftwaffe, since it was never recovered. Other sources indicate that it might've been hit by artillery and captured by the Red Army along with the Śmiały (PP 53) when Lwów fell.

== Sources ==
- Rajmund Szubanski - Poczatek pancernego szlaku. Wyd. Ksiazka i Wiedza, Warszawa 1980.

== See also ==
- List of armoured trains
