= Śmiały (armoured train) =

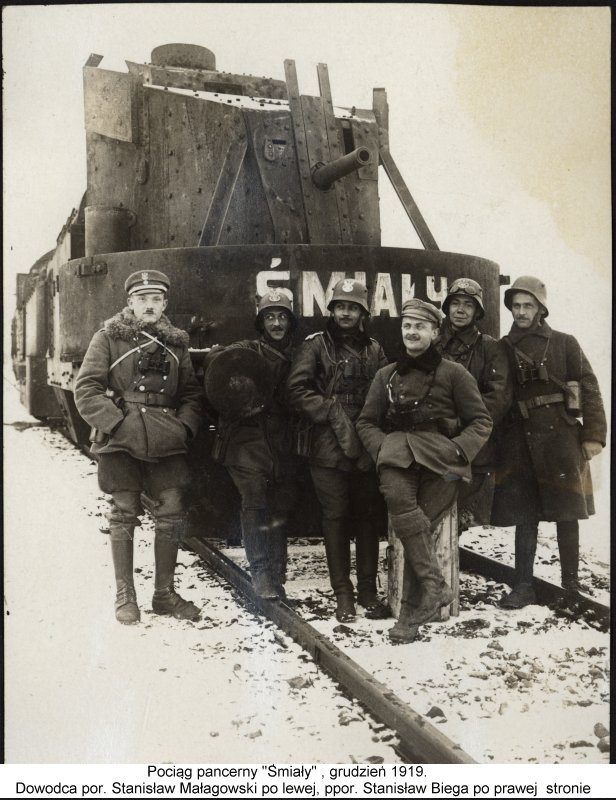
- The armoured train Śmiały in December 1919
- Type: Armoured train
- Place of origin: Austria-Hungary

Service history
- In service: 1914–1945
- Used by: Austria-Hungary; Second Polish Republic; Nazi Germany; Soviet Union
- Wars: World War I; Polish-Ukrainian War; World War II

Specifications
- Crew: 180
- Caliber: 2× 100 mm (3.9 in) howitzers; 2× 75 mm (3.0 in) cannons; 19× heavy machine guns
- Armor: 12 mm (0.47 in)
- Engine: Ti3-type locomotive

The armoured train Śmiały (Polish for Bold), sometimes PP 53 and officially Armoured Train number 53 was an armoured train of the Polish Army that saw significant action during the German Invasion of Poland in September 1939. The train in the end served under four flags—Austrian, Polish, Soviet, German—and fought in several wars from 1914 to 1945. Śmiały distinguished itself in the Battle of Mokra, after which it withdrew eastwards, taking part in the Battle of Brześć Litewski. After the Soviet invasion of Poland on September 17, the train left the western front via Kowel to Lwów, where it fought in the Battle of Lwów. On September 22, 1939, abandoned by its crew, it was seized by the Red Army.

== History ==
=== World War I and Interwar period ===
In the wake of the end of World War I in November 1918 near Kraków, Poles captured an Austrian armoured train. It was renamed Śmiały and immediately entered service. Soon afterwards it was sent to Lwów to fight against the Ukrainians in the Polish-Ukrainian War. In the interwar period, the train was stationed in the 2. Dywizjon Pociągów Pancernych (2nd Battalion of Armoured Trains) located in Niepołomice near Kraków. As with all other Polish armoured trains of the period it was modernised with updated wagons and a Ti3-type armoured locomotive. Before the outbreak of World War II, the train's armament featured two 100mm howitzers, two 75mm cannons, and 19 heavy machine guns. It also was provisioned with two Sokół motorcycles (likely Sokół 1000's), a Renault FT-17 tank (adapted to use rails) and equipment to repair tracks.

=== World War II ===
On August 27, 1939, the train, commanded by Captain Mieczysław Malinowski, was sent from Niepołomice towards the Polish-German border, where it patrolled the rail line Kłobuck-Działoszyn-Chorzew Siemkowice-Nowa Brzeźnica. Śmiały was assigned to the Łódź Army, in support of the Volhynian Cavalry Brigade. On the night of Aug 31/Sep 1, the train left for Chorzew Siemkowice, where it arrived at 5 o’clock in the morning. During the Battle of Mokra, it supported the 21st Vistula Uhlan Regiment, which fought the advancing German 4th Panzer Division. After destroying a number of tanks, the train itself was hit, and forced to retreat to Działoszyn. On September 2, after several skirmishes with German units, the train left for Łask, and on the next day it found itself in Łódź, from where it moved to Koluszki, awaiting orders. In the evening of September 5, Polish units began a general retreat, and Śmiały left towards Skierniewice, Łowicz, and Warsaw.

On September 8, the train arrived at Siedlce, then via Łuków it came to Brześć nad Bugiem, arriving there on September 14. Near the station of Żabinka, Śmiały repulsed the attack of the 10th Panzer Division. In the afternoon of September 14, the Wehrmacht captured the main rail station at Brześć, and Śmiały withdrew to Kowel, then to Łuck, where it arrived on September 16. The next day, after news of the Soviet invasion of Poland reached its crew, the train headed southwards, to Lwów, where it arrived on September 18. Śmiały operated in the area of the Lwów-Łyczaków rail station, supporting Polish infantry in the Battle of Lwów. On September 19, it took part in a raid on Kamionka Strumiłowa, returning to the Lwów-Podzamcze station in the evening. After the capitulation of Polish forces in the city, the train was abandoned by its crew, and seized by the Red Army, possibly along with the Bartosz Głowacki (PP 55).

== See also ==
- Armoured trains of Poland
- List of armoured trains
