= Armata 75 mm wz.02/26 =

Armata 75 mm wz.02/06
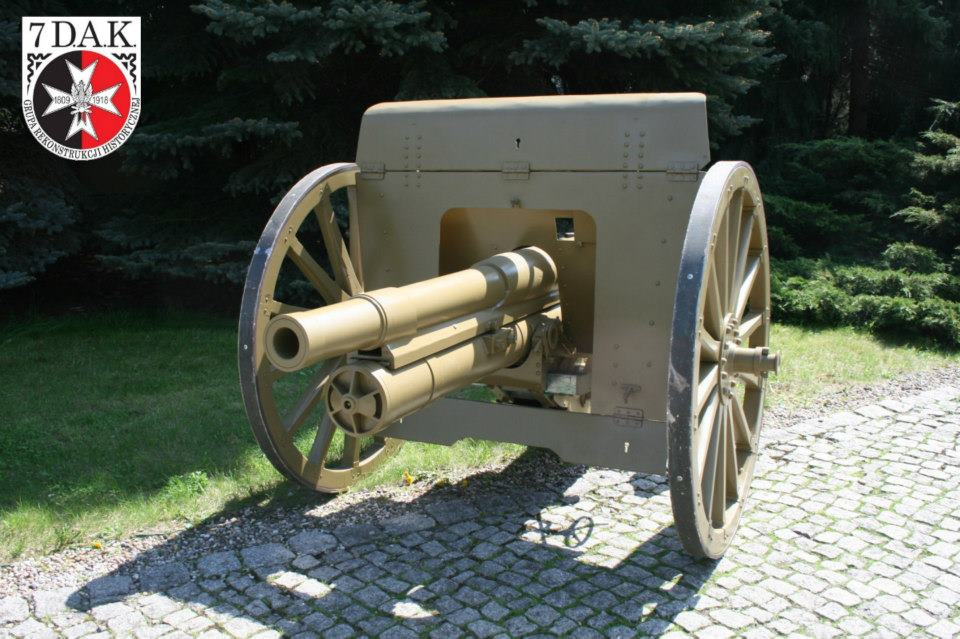
- wz.02/26 replica built by the Historical Reenactment Society of the 7th Horse Artillery Regiment.
- Type: Field gun
- Place of origin: Russian Empire; USSR

Service history
- In service: 1926-1945
- Used by: Poland
- Wars: World War II

Production history
- Designer: Putilovski Works
- Designed: 1902
- Manufacturer: Starachowice Works
- Produced: 1926-1930
- No. built: 400?

Specifications
- Mass: 1,040 kg (2,290 lb)
- Barrel length: 2.25 m (7 ft 5 in) 30 calibers
- Width: 1.8 m (5 ft 11 in)
- Height: 1.6 m (5 ft 3 in)
- Crew: 6-7
- Shell: Fixed QF 75 x 350mm R
- Shell weight: 6.5 kg (14 lb)
- Caliber: 75 mm (3.0 in)
- Breech: Interrupted screw
- Carriage: Box trail
- Elevation: -6° to 16°
- Traverse: 5°
- Rate of fire: 10-12 rpm
- Muzzle velocity: 593 m/s (1,950 ft/s)
- Maximum firing range: 8.5 km (5.3 mi)

The Armata 75 mm wz.02/26 was a light field gun used by Poland before and during World War II. It began life as the 76 mm divisional gun M1902, a Russian light field gun used in the Russo-Japanese War, World War I, Russian Civil War and Polish–Soviet War.

== History ==
Poland captured large numbers of M1902 guns in the Polish-Soviet War and pressed them into service as a standard piece of mounted artillery, designated the Armata 76.2 mm wz.1902. In 1923, there were 568 wz.1902 guns in the Polish inventory. Between 1926 and 1930 most surviving 76.2 mm wz.1902 guns were re-chambered to use the same 75 mm shells as the most numerous Polish field gun, the Canon de 75 modèle 1897. The guns were converted by the Starachowice Works and designated as the Armata 75 mm wz.02/26. Most were converted, but some of the original 76.2 mm caliber guns were retained to use captured stocks of Russian ammunition. Guns captured after the Polish defeat were designated by Germany as the 7.5 cm FK 02/06(p).

== Weapons of comparable role, performance and era ==
- 7.7 cm FK 96 n.A. German equivalent
- Canon de 75 modèle 1897 French equivalent
- Ordnance BLC 15-pounder British equivalent
- 3-inch M1902 field gun US equivalent

== See also ==
- 120 mm Armata wz. 78/09/31 - Another conversion carried out by the Starachowice Works.
- 105 mm Armata wz. 29 - A field gun built under license by the Starachowice Works.

== References and external links ==
- Shunkov V. N. - The Weapons of the Red Army, Mn. Harvest, 1999 (Шунков В. Н. - Оружие Красной Армии. - Мн.: Харвест, 1999.) ISBN 985-433-469-4
- Russian Putilov 76.2mm m/02 Field Gun at Landships II
- 76 K/02 at FlamesOfWar
