= Danuta (armoured train) =

Polish WWII armoured train

Pociąg Pancerny 11 "Danuta"
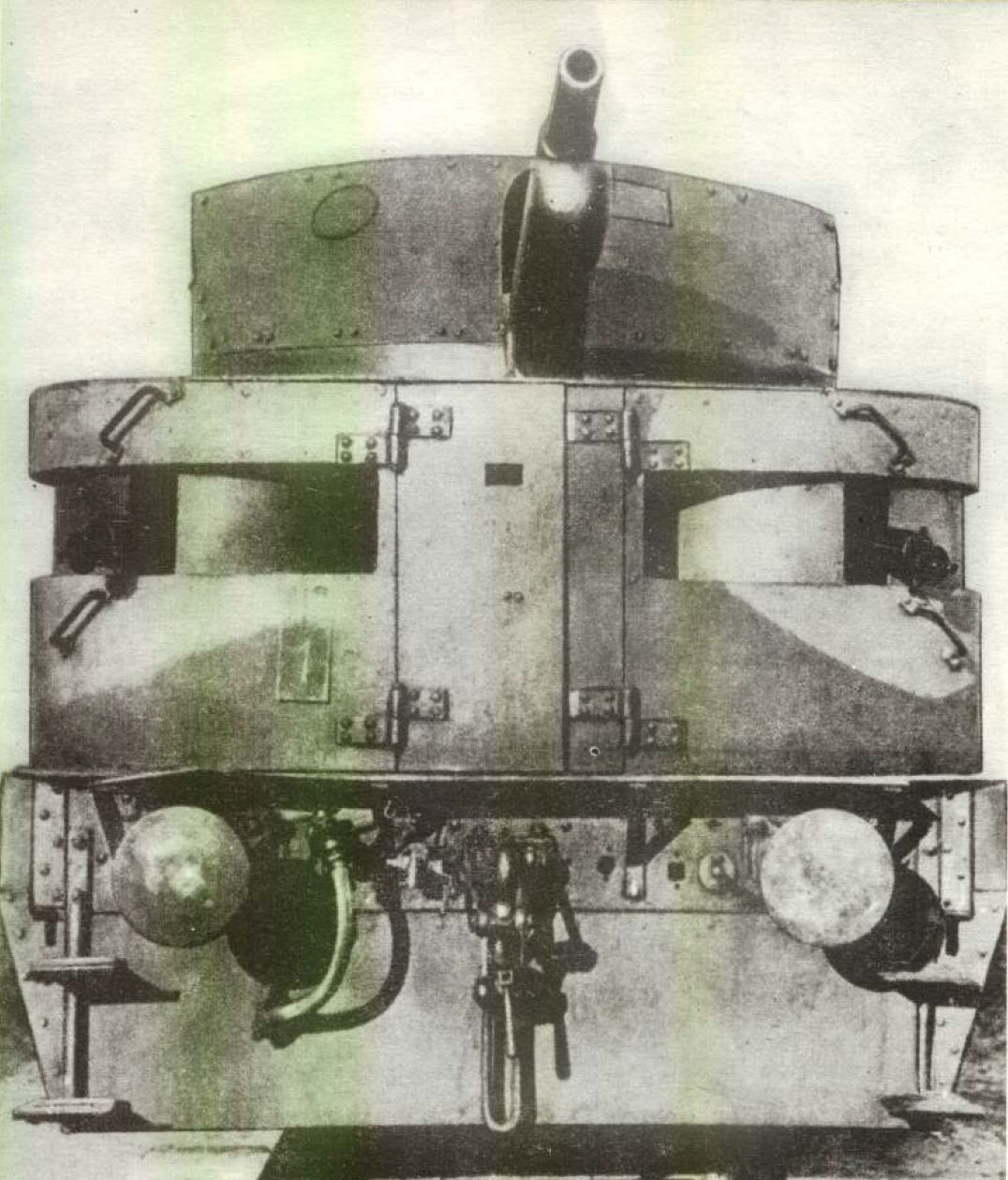
- Frontal view of the artillery wagon with a turret-mounted 100 mm howitzer on top and two 7.92 mm heavy machine guns on both sides
- Type: Heavy armoured train
- Place of origin: Poland

Service history
- In service: c.1920−1939
- Used by: Poland
- Wars: Second World War

Production history
- Manufacturer: Cegielski Works

Specifications (PP 11 Danuta)
- Mass: 103 tonnes (locomotive with tender, coal, and water); 10 tonnes (Pdkz combat flatcars)
- Length: 16.17 m (53.1 ft) (locomotive and tender); 17.20 m (56.4 ft) (artillery wagons); 10.6 m (35 ft) (assault wagon)
- Crew: 120−130
- Armor: Steel; 8–20 mm (0.31–0.79 in) (locomotive and tender); 12–25 mm (0.47–0.98 in) (other wagons); 5–8 mm (0.20–0.31 in) (floors and roofs)
- Main armament: 4× 100 mm wz. 1914/19 howitzers; 4× 75 mm wz.1902/26 field guns
- Secondary armament: 22× 7.92 mm wz. 08 HMGs
- Engine: Ti3 steam locomotive
- Operational range: 300 km (190 mi) (Note: While the tender carried enough coal for 300 km (190 mi), the boilers had to be refilled with water every 80 km (50 mi).)
- Maximum speed: 65 km/h (40 mph)

The Danuta, also called Pociąg Pancerny 11 (Armoured Train Number 11), was a Polish armoured train used by the Polish Army during the German invasion of Poland in September 1939. The name Danuta was also used by a previous armoured train that was used during the Polish-Soviet War.

== Background ==
Following its independence on 11 November 1918, the newly reformed Polish Army quickly found itself involved in a series of conflicts (the Polish-Ukrainian War, the Polish-Soviet War, the Silesian Uprisings, and the Polish-Lithuanian War). Lacking paved roads, the Poles had to rely on armoured trains to quickly transport troops and provide fire support.

In August 1920, PP 9 Danuta (built in Kraków in January 1919) participated in the Battle for Warsaw, against the Red Army. The PP 9 used an Austro-Hungarian-built Class 229 steam locomotive and an ex-German armoured car.

During Poland's interwar conflicts, some armoured trains were scrapped or destroyed, passing their name to a new train.

== History ==
The PP 11 Danuta was built by the Cegielski Works in Poznań in the early 1920s.

In 1930, the remaining armoured trains in Polish service were integrated into the armored divisions, while in 1931 they were modernized, with the number of wagons reduced to improve maneuverability, improved machine gun turrets allowing the guns to fire either in front or rear along the sides of the train, the old Austro-Hungarian and Russian artillery pieces were replaced with modernized Polish pieces, while the wagons themselves were replaced with new rolling stock. A "smoke extractor" device invented by Captain Wikarski was fitted on the smokestacks to make the trains less conspicuous, but attempts to replace the steam locomotives with diesel-electric locomotives never got past prototype stage.

Prior to World War II, the Danuta was operating alongside the German border near the Noteć river. While several Polish commanders (correctly) predicted that armoured trains would be poorly suited for frontline service when faced with enemies making use tanks and aircraft, besides the complete dependence on rail tracks; they were often the only armor available in divisions or brigades, specially after the High Command was forced to raise new mobile reserves. They could also operate in areas lacking paved roads but with well-established rail networks.

=== Second World War ===
After the Polish Army was mobilised in 1939, the train was assigned to the Poznań Army. In the first days of the war, the Danuta under the command of Captain B. Korobowicz, provided fire support for the 26th Infantry Division and patrolled the Chodzież−Szamocin area before retreating to Inowrocław. Next the train participated in the Battle of the Bzura. On 16 September, the train fought the Germans near Rząśno (according to Magnuski) or Jackowice (according to Malmassari) when the engine was hit by anti-tank gun fire from the 24th Infantry Division, immobilizing the Danuta. The surviving crew blew up the damaged train to prevent capture, but the Germans managed to salvage an artillery wagon and the assault troop wagon: these were incorporated into the PZ 21 armoured train.

== The composition of the train in 1939 ==
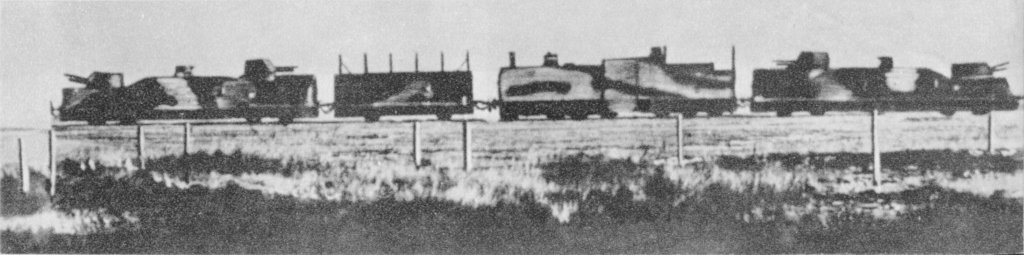
The Danuta from 1939. From the left: artillery wagon, infantry assault wagon, armoured locomotive, artillery wagon.

=== Locomotive and tender ===
The Danuta was powered by an armoured Ti3 steam locomotive with a 12.C.1 tender. It was protected against small arms fire and shrapnel by rolled homogeneous armour (RHA) plates 8–20 mm (0.31–0.79 in) thick. The locomotive also featured a telephone system to allow communication between driver and commander and colored lights to deliver traffic signals; while the tender (where the commander cupola was located) was fitted with its signalling devices to relay orders during combat, such as: lights, a telephone system (used to communicate with the long-range transceiver radio located in the assault wagon), an electric horn, speaking tubes, and a short-range transceiver radio used to communicate with the scout tanks.

=== Artillery wagons ===
The train had two artillery wagons and each one carried two 100 mm wz. 1914/19 howitzers and 75 mm wz.1902/26 field guns mounted on rotating turrets as their primary armament, while secondary armament was composed of nine 7.92 mm wz. 08 machine guns: one was mounted on the roof as an anti-aircraft gun, while the rest was mounted on the front and sides of the wagon, which was protected by RHA plates 12–25 mm (0.47–0.98 in) thick on the sides and 5–8 mm (0.20–0.31 in) thick on the floor and roof. These wagons also featured communication and signalling devices, heating and ventilation systems, ammunition containers, personal weapon racks, seats, and even coffee tanks for the crew.

=== Assault wagon ===
The armoured assault wagon was usually located between the leading artillery wagon and the locomotive, it carried an infantry platoon and a transceiver radio powered by a diesel generator. This generator was also used to charge a 24 V battery which provided electricity for the entire train. This wagon was armed with four 7.92 mm wz.08 machine guns while protection was the same as the artillery wagons. Equipment was also similar, but it also carried a stretcher for the wounded while hatches were installed at the bottom for landing troops. According to Magnuski, the train had a crew of approximately 120−130 personnel (two gunner platoons − artillery and machine gun crews, assault platoon, and a technician platoon − sappers, conductors, etc.).

=== Auxiliaries ===
On both ends of the train, two-axle Pkdz combat flatcars with a load bearing capacity of 17.5 tonnes were attached. They carried tools and other equipment necessary for repairing railway tracks and small bridges, alongside explosives and incendiary devices.

Like other Polish armoured trains, the Danuta was accompanied by a supply train: it featured sleeping quarters for the officers and privates, an office car, an ambulance car, a kitchen car, a repair workshop car, coal cars, tanker cars, and storage cars.

It also had its own tank detachment: Renault FT light tanks, TK or TKS tankettes were mounted on special draisines to run on railway tracks. These draisines also had an hydraulic system which allowed the tank to be lowered on the ground if necessary. These tanks were used to scout the track ahead and attack enemy infantry trying to approach the train.

== Gallery ==
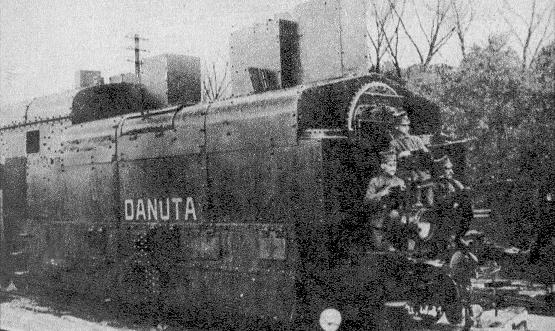
PP 9 Danuta (1919)

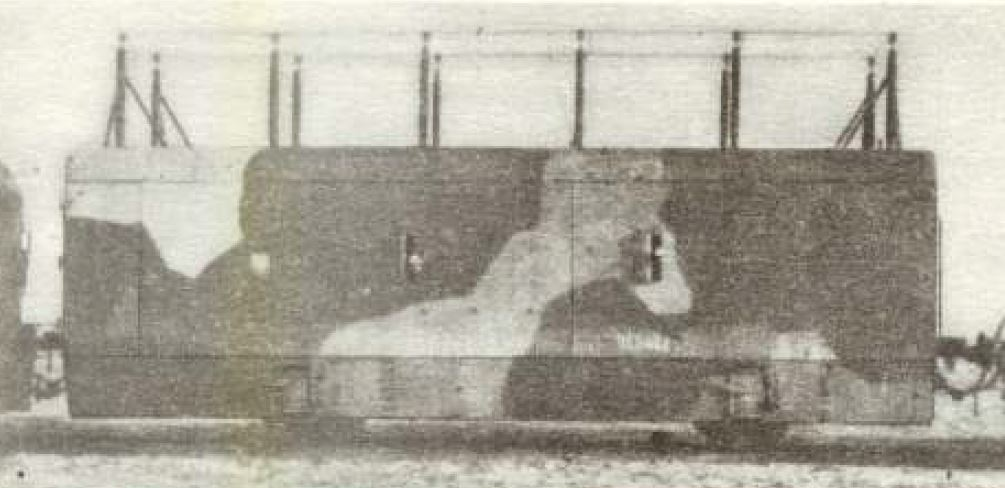
Assault wagon

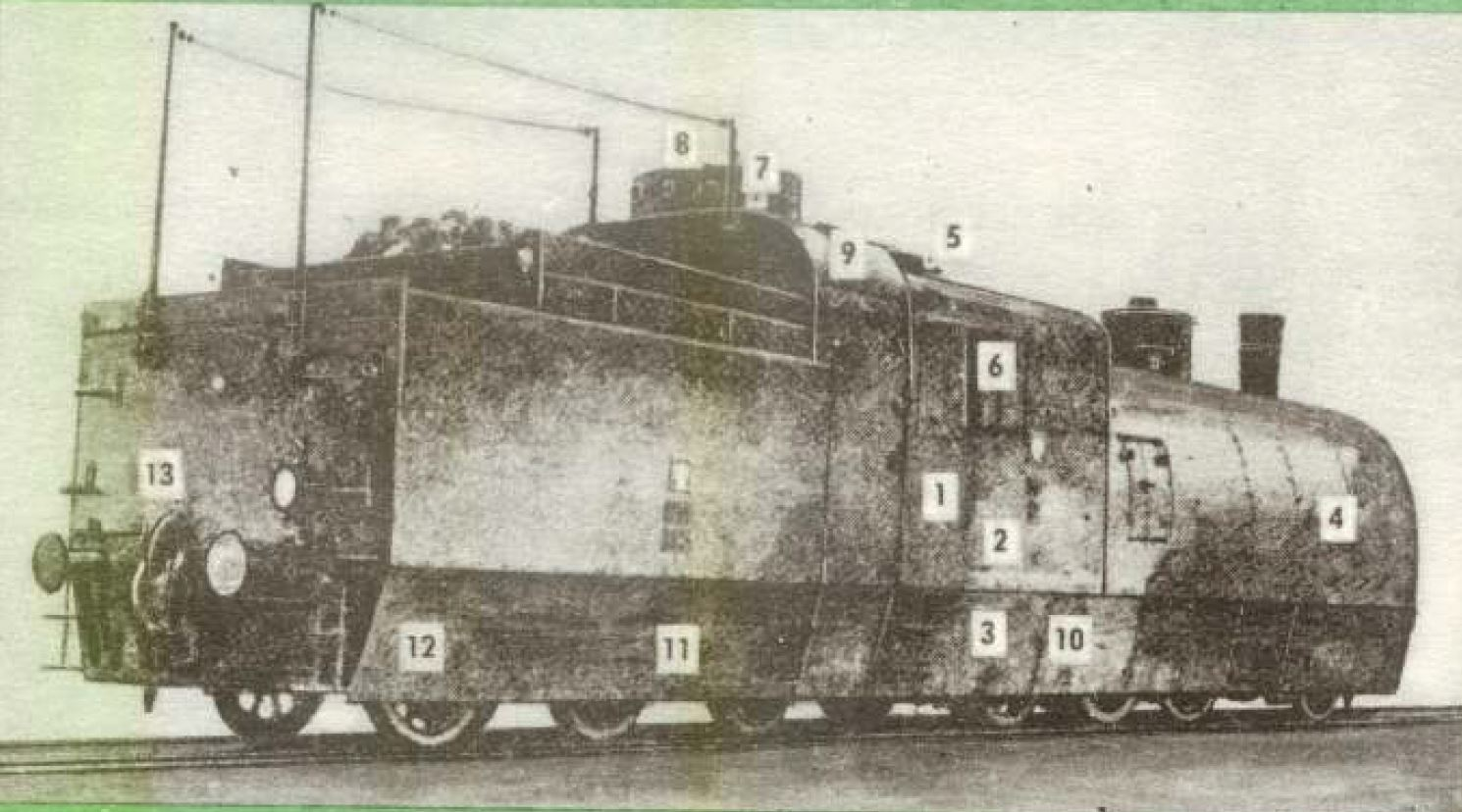
Ti3 steam locomotive

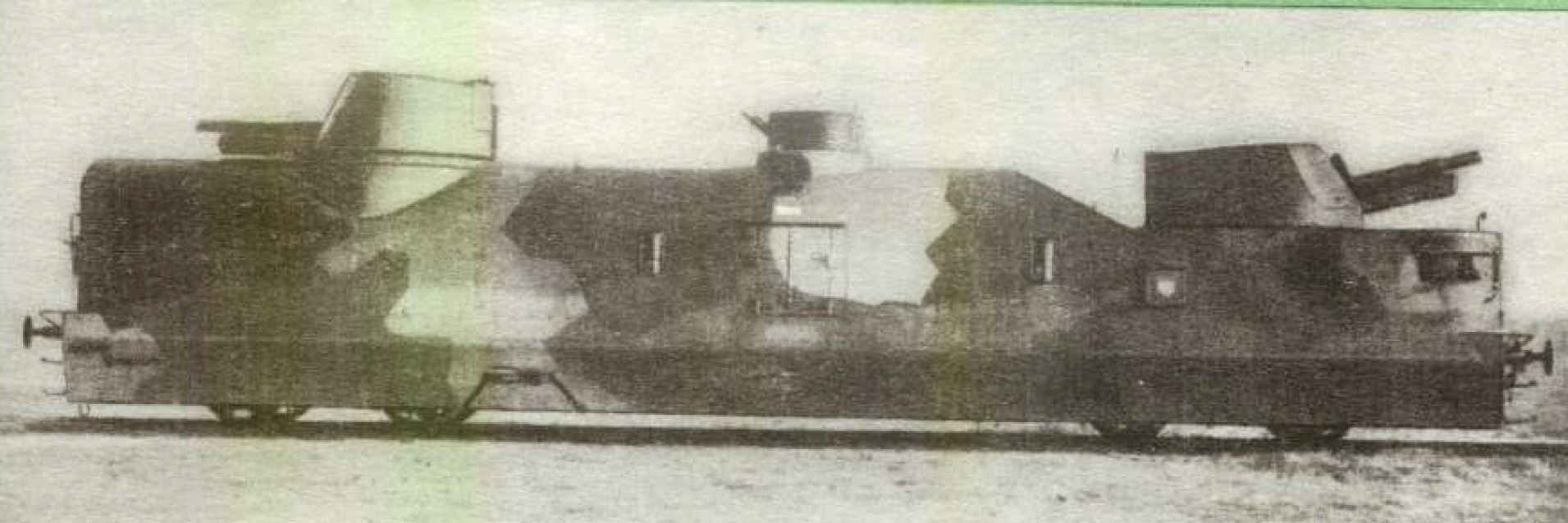
Artillery wagon

== Citations ==
=== Bibliography ===
- Magnuski, Janusz (1972). Typy Broni Uzbrojenia nr 18 − Pociąg Pancerny Danuta [Weapons and Armaments Types n° 18 − Armored Train Danuta] (in Polish). Warsaw: Wydawnictwo Ministerstwa Obrony Narodowej. OCLC 838957139.
- Malmassari, Paul (2016) [1989]. Armoured Trains (2nd revised and expanded ed.). Barnsley, UK: Seaforth Publishing. ISBN 978-1-84832-262-2.
- Zaloga, Steven J; Madej, Victor (1991). The Polish Campaign, 1939. New York, NY: Hippocrene Books. ISBN 978-0-87052-013-6.

== See also ==
- List of armoured trains
