= General Sosnkowski (armoured train) =

Polish armoured train

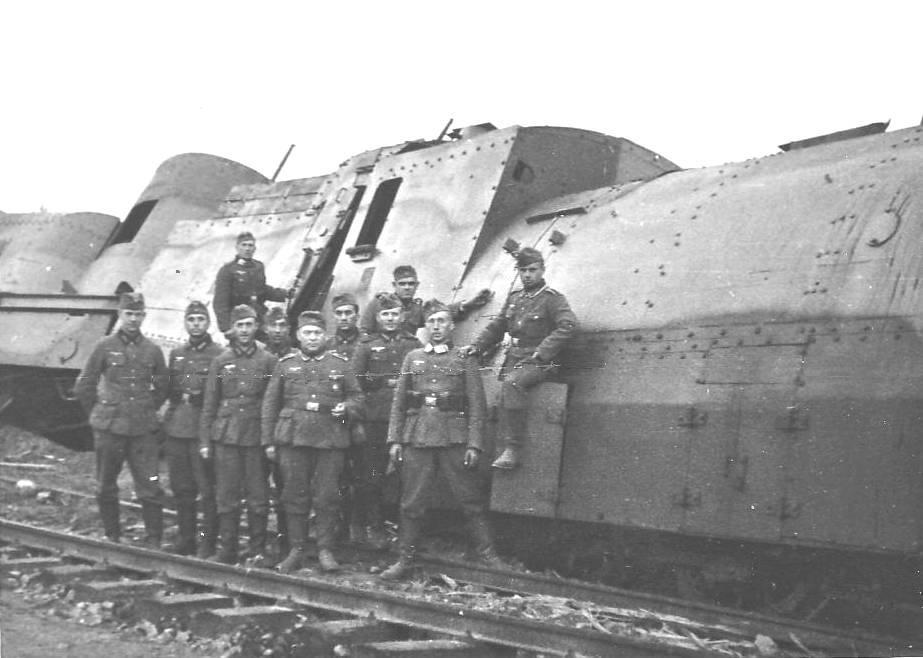

The Generał Sosnkowski was a Polish armoured train that was developed during the Second Polish Republic.

The PP 13 Generał Sosnkowski was built in 1920, at the Cegielski plant in Poznań, and named after Kazimierz Sosnkowski. Though modernized in the 1930s, its outward appearance retained its earlier characteristics. It saw action during the Polish-Bolshevik War and the Invasion of Poland (1939).
