= Russian armoured train Volga =

Volga
- Type: Armoured train
- Place of origin: Russia

Service history
- In service: 2022–Present
- Used by: Russia; Russian Armed Forces; Russian Railway Troops
- Wars: Russo-Ukrainian war

Production history
- Designer: Western Military District
- Manufacturer: Western Military District
- No. built: 1

Specifications
- Length: 106 m (347.7 ft)
- Diameter: 1,435mm gauge
- Armor: 20mm of steel Lines of sandbags
- Main armament: 2x ZU-23-2 cannon
- Secondary armament: Few dozen Machine Gun slots
- Engine: 2x ChME3-type locomotive

The Russian armoured train Volga (call sign "Breakthrough") is an armoured train currently in use by Russia in Russo-Ukrainian war. Unlike its sister train Yenisei, which is built primarily for logistics and refugee ferrying, Volga is primarily used for engineering, reconnaissance, mine clearance, restoration of damaged railway tracks, and escorting cargo within the Ukrainian combat zones.

== Specifications and details ==
Volga is protected by an outer casing of 20mm worth of rolled steel, backed by wooden panels and reinforced by a line of sandbags. It is primarily defended by two ZU-23-2 cannons situated at the front and the back of the train, respectively. For secondary weapons, Volga has two enclosed gun carriages where machine guns and other small arms could be mounted in its firing slits. It is primarily a mine clearing and logistical vehicle; as such, like Yenisei, Volga is situated in the backlines.

The train is currently made up of at least two ChME3-type locomotives plus six wagons. Outside of the two locomotives which are situated in the center of the train, Volga has two empty platform wagons for cargo, logistical and mine-clearing purposes situated at the front and end of the train. Two anti-air wagons mounting the ZU-23-2 are behind the respective platform wagons. Two enclosed gun/troop wagon hybrids carry the majority of the crew. The majority of the crewmen sleep in the gun/troop wagon. The goods wagon is also where the train's kitchen staff is located to provide the crewmen food as well as a room containing a small sauna for their convenience. In terms of length, each wagon is made from the standard United Wagon Company Sgmmns 40’ flat car, which is 40 feet long. Combined, the Volga train is 106 meters long. A unique feature for the Volga is that its crew comes along with a UAV drone team to better scout for dangers ahead of the train.

Like Yenisei, this is not the first armoured train used in the Russo-Ukrainian War, as a few other armoured trains were recorded transporting logistical and military goods through Crimea in March 2022.

== See also ==
- Armoured trains
- Russian armoured train Yenisei
- Russian armoured train Amur
- Russian armoured train Baikal
- Krajina Express
- List of armoured trains
- 2022 Russian invasion of Ukraine
- List of Russo-Ukrainian War military equipment
- Russo-Ukrainian War
