= Russian armoured train Baikal =

Baikal
- Video presumed to be Baikal under different configuration in 2023.
- Type: Armoured train
- Place of origin: Russia

Service history
- In service: 2016–Present
- Used by: Russia; Russian Armed Forces; Russian Railway Troops
- Wars: Russo-Ukrainian war

Production history
- Designer: Western Military District
- Manufacturer: Western Military District
- No. built: 1

Specifications
- Length: 102 m (336 ft) (2016 configuration); 132 m (432 ft) (2022 configuration)
- Diameter: 1,435mm gauge
- Armor: 20mm rolled steel Sandbags with wooden panels Mine-resistant ballast materials
- Main armament: 1x ZU-23-2 cannon (2016 configuration); 2x ZU-23-2 cannons (2022 configuration)
- Secondary armament: 1x Kamysh M4K electronic warfare system 1x unknown anti-air missile system 2-4x Machine gun emplacements 2x AGS-17 grenade launchers
- Engine: 1x ChME3-type locomotive (2016 configuration); 2x ChME3-type locomotive (2022 configuration)

Baikal (Russian: Байкал, "Lake Baikal") is an armoured train currently in use by the Railway Troops of the Russian Armed Forces. Baikal and its sister train Amur first appeared in 2016 to be used for rear-line logistical exercises, but has seen service in the Russo-Ukrainian war. Baikal is currently one of four armoured trains known to be operated by the Russian Railway Troops, including Amur and the newer trains Yenisei and Volga.

== Specifications and details ==
Baikal saw substantial changes in configuration between its reactivation in 2016, to its participation in the Ukrainian invasion in 2022. Originally, like its sister train Amur, Baikal only had one ChME3-type locomotive to power it and consisted of a total of 8 cars including locomotive. In total, Baikal was 102.4 meters long given that each wagon is made from the standard United Wagon Company Sgmmns 40’ flat car, which is 40 feet long. Its 2016 layout was a cover platform at the front, an anti-aircraft gun car armed with a ZU-23-2, the ChME3-class locomotive, a kitchen and dining car, a sleeper car, a radio station car, a HQ car for command and control, and an electronic warfare jammer car armed with a Kamysh M4K system that could also be used for anti-mine purposes. For defence, the anti-air gun car is protected by shields and rolled steel of unknown thickness and both Amur and Baikal utilize heavily on camouflage nets helps reduce the visibility of the armored trains as targets.

By 2022, Baikal was extended from an eight-wagon train to a ten-wagon train. An additional ChME3-type locomotive was added to provide more power to the train and the train was overall, far more symmetrical. Its two locomotives for example, was protected by a corresponding anti-air armored car at the back, each equipped with ZU-23s. Meanwhile, the front of the train representing its 'face' consisted of an open-top armoured car filled with Russian troops, machine gun and AGS-17 grenade launcher emplacements featuring VOG-17 30mm ammunition. Behind the front anti-air car, Baikal has a box car that is assumed to be armed with a covert anti-air missile system. An armored passenger HQ car follows behind said box car which serves as both a compartment for weaponry and the command center for operational activities; firing apertures on the sides allow personnel to engage targets using their personal firearms from within the protected interior. Following said passenger HQ car is a flatbed car for vehicle transportation purposes in the central part of the train. Afterwards, there is an additional open-top armored car before transitioning to the second anti-air car and locomotive. At the end of the train lay another flatbed car for equipment loading purposes. For defence, the entire train carriage is protected by shields and rolled steel of up to 20mm which is further reinforced by sandbags behind wooden panels. To counter mine explosions, the train incorporates platforms loaded with ballast materials like sand-filled bags, rails, and sleepers which act as a safeguard against the effects of mine explosions. Additionally, both Amur and Baikal utilize heavily on camouflage nets to help reduce the visibility of the armored trains as targets. In total, the 2022 configuration made Baikal 131.6 meters long and the list of equipment makes Baikal the most armed of its 'sister' trains.

Amur and Baikal, was originally used for logistical exercises back in 2016, however, with the advent of the 2022 Russian invasion of Ukraine, Baikal performed a role similar to that of Yenisei, in which it was primarily used as a rear-line unit meant for technical reconnaissance, mine clearance, and the restoration of the railway track and small man-made constructions with minimal destruction. Although this has changed recently by December 2023, to a more active role in the front lines. Like Volga, Baikal also has a dedicated UAV drone team for scouting and reconnaissance purposes.

== History ==
Outside of training exercises in 2016, Baikal saw extensive military action during the 2022 Russian invasion of Ukraine. Of the armoured trains present in this conflict, Baikal has a more known service history. Baikal was first reported on early March 2022, where it was reported that the train was directly involved in Russian military activities within Ukraine. The first 'official' sighting was registered on March 9, 2022, where the train was geolocated around 25km north of Melitopol at that time. The purpose of deploying Baikal so close to the front line was assumed to be more defensive in nature. Baikal was to be used as a mobile fortress, a landship on rails needed to safeguard the military supplies of the Russian army near the vicinity of the warzone. This indicates that the crew of Baikal was trained to have a higher measure of alertness against Ukrainian sabotage attempts behind Russian lines. Indeed, videos emerged that showcased exercises conducted on an unidentified armoured train – likely Yenisei given the presence of the loaded BMP-2 – where the train's soldiers, supported by two armoured personnel carriers, formed a column of two, with the train subsequently retracting from the battle scene. The exercise was reported to be called as an "offensive" or "sabotage task force". The nature of such maneuvres is deduced as a way to better streamline the dropping off of equipment and personnel in a new form of engagement strategy akin to a landing ship.

== See also ==
- Armoured trains
- Russian armoured train Yenisei
- Russian armoured train Volga
- Russian armoured train Amur
- Krajina Express
- List of armoured trains
- 2022 Russian invasion of Ukraine
- List of Russo-Ukrainian War military equipment
- Russo-Ukrainian War
