= Russian armoured train Yenisei =

Yenisei
- Type: Armoured train
- Place of origin: Ukraine; Russia

Service history
- In service: 2022–Present
- Used by: Russia; Russian Armed Forces; Russian Railway Troops
- Wars: 2022 Russian invasion of Ukraine

Production history
- Designer: Ukrainian Railways
- Manufacturer: Ukrainian Railways
- No. built: 1

Specifications
- Length: 131 m (429.7 ft)
- Diameter: 1,435mm gauge
- Passengers: 1,000 (claimed)
- Armor: 20mm rolled steel Sandbags with wooden panels Mine-resistant ballast materials
- Main armament: 1x 30 mm autocannon 2A42 (BMP-2)
- Secondary armament: 1x ZU-23-2 cannon Few dozen Machine Gun slots Few 82-BM-37 mortars
- Engine: 2x ChME3-type locomotive

The Russian armoured train Yenisei is an armoured train currently in use by Russia in their ongoing invasion of Ukraine in 2022. According to Ukrainian sources, Yenisei was constructed out of parts stolen from Ukrainian Railways in the Kharkiv region. It is named after the Yenisey river.

== Specifications and details ==
The train is protected by armoured plates of unknown thickness and is designed to transport materials, to restore and demine tracks that are damaged, and for engineering reconnaissance. However, the train also has a ZU-23-2 and a mounted BMP-2, and thus is also suspected of being prepared for combat operations. Russian sources dispute Yenisei's role as a combat vehicle, claiming rather that the train is used for humanitarian purposes such as the delivery of water, medicines and food for civilians in Donbas, and evacuating over a thousand people from the combat zones.

The train is currently made up of at least two ChME3-type locomotives plus eight wagons (two of which are platforms from the BMP-2 and ZU-23-2). On a whole, Yenisei is made up of two empty platform wagons for cargo, logistical and construction purposes at the front and end of the train, a platform wagon mounting the BMP-2 as the 'head', followed by an anti-air wagon mounting the ZU-23-2 gun alongside an enclosed cabin with six machine-gun slits, the first ChME3-type locomotive, a machine gun wagon with more gun slits, a goods wagon, another machine-gun wagon and the second ChME3-type locomotive. In addition to the above weapons, Yenisei also ferries a group in charge of maintaining and firing a number of 82-BM-37 mortars both either on or outside of the train. In terms of length, each wagon is made from the standard United Wagon Company Sgmmns 40’ flat car, which is 40 feet long. Combined, Yenisei is a 131 meters long.

Like Volga, this is not the first armoured train used in the Russo-Ukrainian War, as a few other armoured trains were recorded transporting logistical and military goods through Crimea in March 2022.

== History ==
Not much is known on Yenisei's military service outside of Russian claims that it was primarily used for refugee evacuation. In December 2023, however, new videos emerged showcasing an armoured train exercise. The train - likely to be Yenisei given the presence of a loaded BMP-2 - was conducting a new form of engagement procedure that was more 'front-line' than the traditional 'rear-line' logistical support role it was originally given. In this exercise, the train would quickly load one or two BMP-2s with its optimum personnel before entering near the front-lines to swiftly drop off heavy equipment and personnel and then promptly disengaging from the battle scene. Given the dominance of Russian rail-lines in Eastern Ukraine that streamlines Russian logistics, the exercise indicates a change in Russian armoured train tactics, with trains such as Yenisei becoming an important asset for resource distribution and armed transportation across the occupied areas.

== See also ==
- Armoured trains
- Russian armoured train Volga
- Russian armoured train Amur
- Russian armoured train Baikal
- Krajina Express
- List of armoured trains
- 2022 Russian invasion of Ukraine
- List of Russo-Ukrainian War military equipment
- Russo-Ukrainian War
