= Russian armoured train Amur =

Amur
- Type: Armoured train
- Place of origin: Russia

Service history
- In service: 2016–Present
- Used by: Russia; Russian Armed Forces; Russian Railway Troops
- Wars: Russo-Ukrainian war

Production history
- Designer: Western Military District
- Manufacturer: Western Military District
- No. built: 1

Specifications
- Length: 163 m (534.7 ft)
- Diameter: 1,435mm gauge
- Armor: Unknown thickness of rolled steel
- Main armament: 1x ZU-23-2 cannon
- Secondary armament: 1x Kamysh M4K electronic warfare system
- Engine: 1x ChME3-type locomotive

The Russian armoured train Amur is an armoured train currently in use by Russia in its Russo-Ukrainian war. Unlike the newer trains Yenisei and Volga, Amur was already built long before the Russian invasion of Ukraine. Both Amur and its sister train, Baikal, were reactivated back in 2016, originally for rear-line logistical purposes.

== Specifications and details ==
Amur is the longest armoured train in Russia's armed train fleet. In total, Amur has 13 cars including the locomotive. Unlike its more recent sister trains, the Amur only has one ChME3-type locomotive to power it. In terms of length, each wagon is made from the standard United Wagon Company Sgmmns 40’ flat car, which is 40 feet long. Combined, the Amur train is 163 meters long.

In terms of the train's layout, it is followed: A freight car at the front that carries equipment and material, an anti-aircraft gun carriage armed with a ZU-23-2, the ChME3-class locomotive, a kitchen and dining car, two corresponding sleeper cars, a radio station car, an electronic warfare jammer car, a HQ car for command and control, two more additional freight cars, a crane car to offload and onload materials, and a cover platform car. With regards to the Amur specifically, its EW car can be dual-use for anti-mine purposes as it incorporates a Kamysh M4K system, which uses white noise to interfere with radio-controlled IEDs at a distance of up to 20 meters. For defence, the entire train carriage is protected by shields and rolled steel of up to 20mm which is further reinforced by sandbags behind wooden panels. Both Amur and Baikal utilize heavily on camouflage nets to help reduce the visibility of the armored trains as targets.

Amur and Baikal were originally used for logistical exercises back in 2016, however, with the advent of the 2022 Russian invasion of Ukraine, Amur performed a role similar to that of Yenisei, in which it was primarily used as a rear-line unit meant for technical reconnaissance, mine clearance, and the restoration of the railway track and small man-made constructions with minimal destruction.

== See also ==
- Armoured trains
- Russian armoured train Yenisei
- Russian armoured train Volga
- Russian armoured train Baikal
- Krajina Express
- List of armoured trains
- 2022 Russian invasion of Ukraine
- List of Russo-Ukrainian War military equipment
- Russo-Ukrainian War
