= ČKD T-669 diesel locomotive =

Czechoslovak diesel locomotive

T 669 T 669 and others
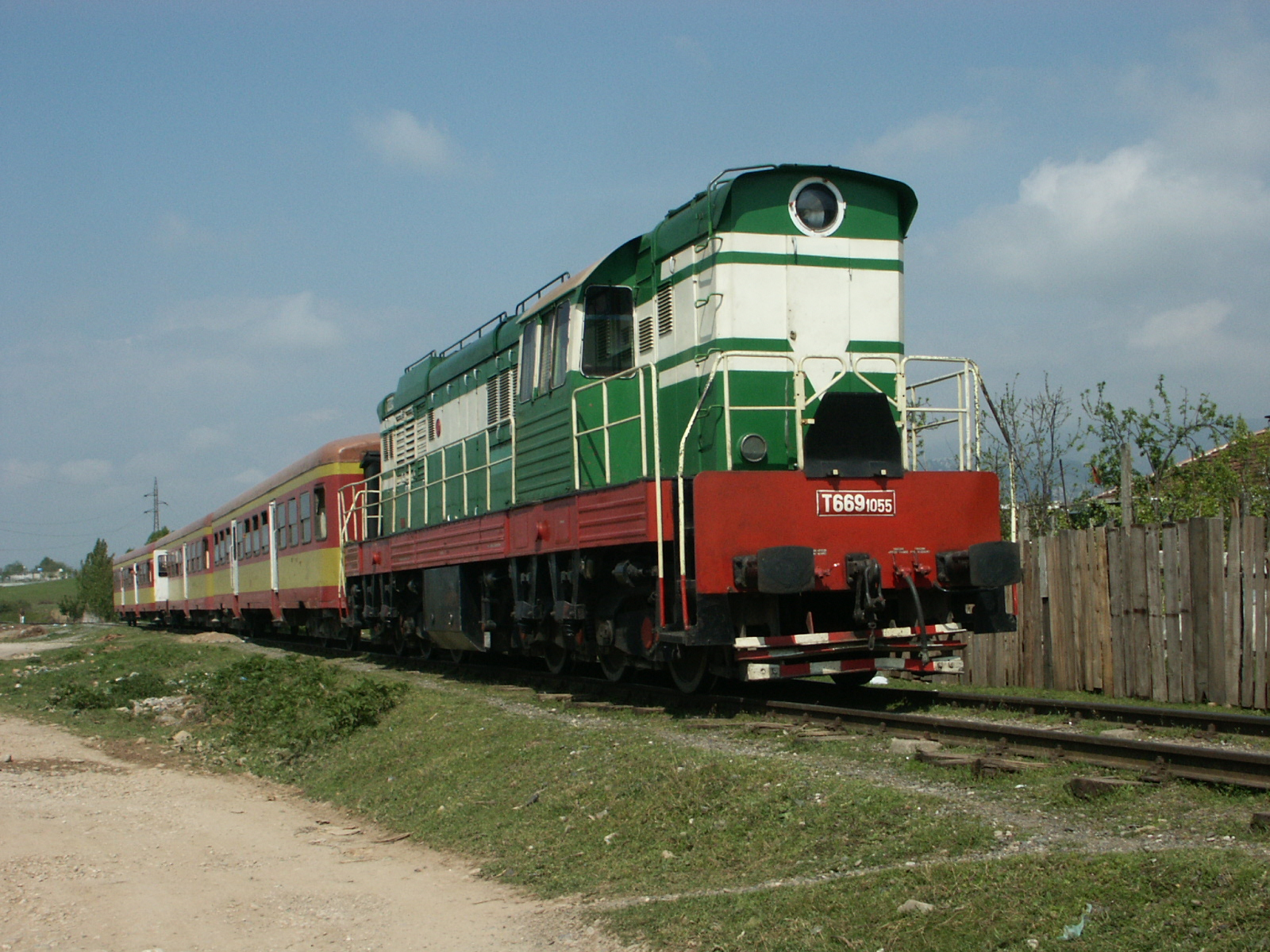
- T 669 at Durrës station in Albania
Type and origin
- Power type: Diesel-electric
- Builder: ČKD
- Model: T669.0 770
- Build date: 1968-1990
Specifications
- Configuration
  - UIC: Co′Co′
- Gauge: 1,435 mm (4 ft 8 1/2 in) standard gauge - 1,520 mm (4 ft 11 27/32 in); 1,676 mm (5 ft 6 in)
- Wheel diameter: 1,050 mm (41.34 in)
- Wheelbase: 8,660 mm (28 ft 5 in)
- Length: 17,240 mm (56 ft 6 3/4 in)
- Loco weight: 115 t (113 long tons; 127 short tons)
- Fuel type: Diesel
- Prime mover: ČKD K 6 S 310 DR
- RPM range: 750
- Engine type: Diesel
- Cylinders: 6
- Cylinder size: 310 mm × 360 mm (12.2 in × 14.2 in)
- Transmission: DC Electric
- MU working: yes
Performance figures
- Maximum speed: 90 km/h (56 mph)
- Power output: 993 kW (1,332 hp)

T-669.0 (770) class diesel locomotives, built by ČKD are six-axle, with two bogies. The wheel pairs are set in radius arms and have a simple coil spring suspension. The body is mounted on the frame with eight anchors. The locomotive is a hood unit type with an internal, eccentrically positioned operator's cab.

== Machinery ==
Located underneath the front hood is the traction assembly – a K 6 S 310 DR diesel engine and a TD 802 traction generator – and auxiliary machinery powered by the diesel engine via a hydrodynamic transmission. Chillers and ventilators are located here as well. TE 006 traction motors are axle-mounted on the wheel sets. Located underneath the rear hood are batteries and a supply of sand.

== Variations ==
After modifications of the seating of the hood on the frame, the T 669.1 (771) and the wide-gauge version T 669.5 (770.8) were created at SMZ Dubnica.

== Users ==
This class of locomotive, manufactured for Czechoslovak State Railways, Soviet Railways, and railways in Poland, Albania, India, Iraq and Syria numbers over 8,000 units, making it the largest series of locomotives ever manufactured in Czechoslovakia.

== See also ==
- ChME3
