= Russian Railway Troops =

Russian railway maintenance military unit

Railway Troops of the Russian Armed Forces
- Железнодорожные войска ВС России
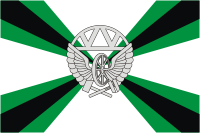
- Flag, great and small emblem
- Active: 6 August 1851–present
- Country: Russian Federation
- Branch: Logistical Support of the Russian Armed Forces
- Role: Railway transport and protection
- Size: 28,500 (approx)
- Garrison/HQ: Smolensk
- Anniversaries: 6 August
- Engagements: Crimea War; January Uprising; Russo-Japanese War; World War I Polish–Soviet War; Battles of Khalkhin Gol; Great Patriotic War; Soviet–Japanese War (1945); Hungarian Revolution of 1956; Prague Spring; Soviet–Afghan War; First Chechen War; Second Chechen War; South Ossetia war 2022 Russian invasion of Ukraine

Commanders
- Current commander: Lieutenant General Oleg Kosenkov (since 2010)

The Railway Troops of the Russian Armed Forces (Russian: Железнодорожные войска ВС России, romanized: Zheleznodorozhnyye voyska VS Rossii) is the railway troops branch of the Logistical Support of the Russian Armed Forces. It is responsible for rear support tasks related to rail services, such as the preparation, construction, reconstruction and protection of railway infrastructure. It is headquartered in Smolensk and its current commander is Lieutenant General Oleg Kosenkov.

The Railway Troops is the oldest railway force in the world, established on 6 August 1851 as a military engineering unit of the Imperial Russian Army. It operates the largest fleet of armoured trains in active military service, of which four are known: Yenisei, Baikal, Volga and Amur.

== History ==
The Railway Troops were first established on 6 August 1851 by decree of Nicholas I, as a military engineering unit of the Imperial Russian Army. In accordance with the document "Regulations on the Management of St. Petersburg – Moscow railway" was formed by 14 separate companies of military-workers, 2 companies of conductors and 1 telegraphy company. The total number reached 4,340 people. The task of the first military railway units was to support the working conditions of railway tracks, crossings, bridges, and their protection. They became part of the Corps of Engineers upon its inception in 1870. Initially, they were organized as "train teams", and from 1876 onward as "railroad battalions". The Railway Troops remained part of the Corps of Engineers until 1908, when they were then designated in a separate category.

The Railway Troops provided a continuous supply line to the Russian Army during the Russo-Turkish War of 1877–78, via railways specially built by the force including the Bender–Galati route. Personnel built about 300 kilometers of broad gauge railway and up to 4,000 km of narrow gauge during World War I from 1914 to 1917. They also restored more than 4,600 kilometers of track and nearly 5,000 kilometers of telephone and telegraph lines associated with the railway tracks.

== Organization ==
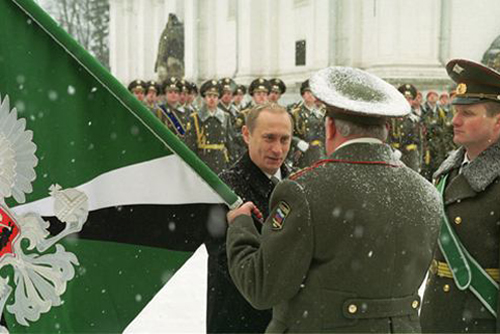
President of Russia Vladimir Putin with Railway Troops at the Cathedral Square, Moscow Kremlin, on 21 February 2002.

The Railway Troops belonged to the Imperial Russian Army and the Soviet Armed Forces continuously from 1851 until 1989, when they were removed from the jurisdiction of the Armed Forces and became a separate service, along with the Border Troops and the Internal Troops. Following the dissolution of the Soviet Union in 1991, the current organisation was established from units located in the territory of the Russian Federation. The Presidential Decree signed on 18 April 1992 №392 "On the Railway Troops of the Russian Federation" General Directorate of railway troops, units, agencies, military and educational institutions and enterprises of railway troops, stationed in the Russian Federation, have been taken under the jurisdiction of the Russian Federation. Presidential Decree of 30 September 1992 №1148 "On the structure of the central bodies of federal executive power" the General Directorate of Railway Troops of the Ministry of Architecture, Building and Housing was reorganized into the Federal Railway Troops of the Ministry of Railways of the Russian Federation, thus confirming them out of the Armed Forces control.

On 7 August 1995, Federal Law of 5 August 1995 N 126-FZ "On the Railway Troops of the Russian Federation" entered into force. According to Presidential Decree №903 signed on September 7, 1995 the Federal Railway Troops of the Ministry of Railways of the Russian Federation were reorganized into the Federal service of railway troops of the Russian Federation.

In accordance with Presidential Decree signed on 3 March 2004 №314 "On the system and structure of federal executive agencies" the Federal Railway Troops Service was abolished and its functions transferred to the Russian Ministry of Defense, effectively returning them to the Armed Forces. The provisions of the decree concerning the Federal Railway Troops of the Russian Federation entered into force after the entry into force of the federal law (Federal Law of 29 June 2004 N 58-FZ). On 5 October 2004, the Railway Troops became subordinated to the Russian Armed Forces Rear Service. In 2010, the Rear Service was reorganised into the Logistical Support of the Russian Armed Forces service.

== Units ==
Units of the Railway Troops as of 2017:

- 5th Separate Railway Brigade (Abakan)
- 7th Separate Railway Brigade (Komsomolsk-on-Amur)
- 9th Separate Railway Brigade (Syzran)
- 29th Separate Railway Brigade (Bryansk)
- 34th Separate Railway Brigade (Ryazan)
- 37th Separate Railway Brigade (Nevinnomyssk, Georgiyevsk)
- 38th Separate Railway Brigade (Vologda)
- 39th Separate Railway Brigade (Krasnodar)
- 43rd Separate Railway Brigade (Yekaterinburg)
- 48th Separate Railway Brigade (Omsk)
- 50th Separate Railway Brigade (Svobodny)
- 333rd Separate Railway Brigade (Volgograd)
- 118th Separate Pontoon-Bridge Railway Battalion (Khabarovsk)
- 333rd Separate Pontoon-Bridge Railway Battalion (Volgograd)

== Equipment ==
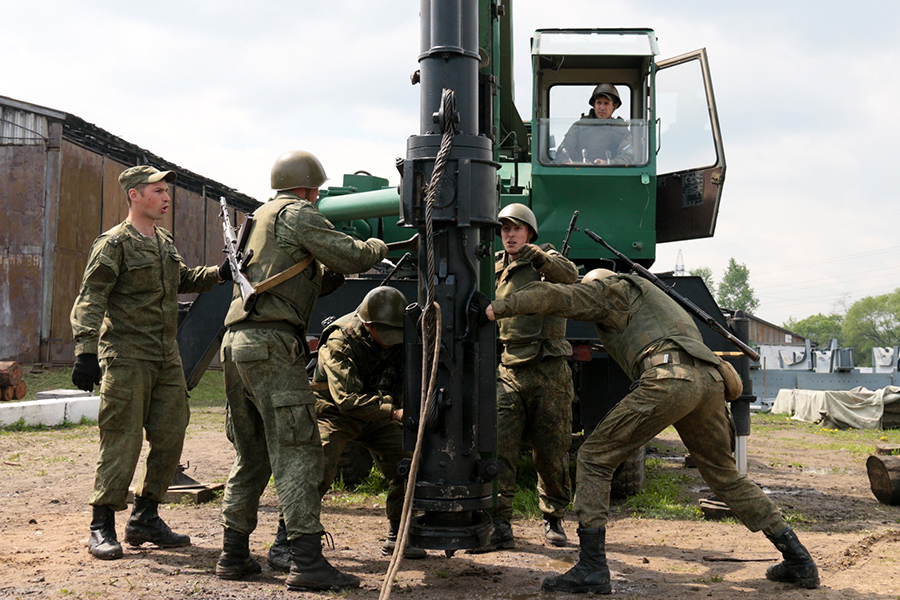
Russian Railway Troops personnel operating a UKA pile driver, 2016

At the disposal of Railway Troops are complex high-performance machines and tools, advanced design and equipment for rehabilitation and construction of railways. The complex includes:

- track machines
- pile-driving and blasting equipment
- overhead traveling cranes
- railway cranes
- collapsible structure and support
- inventory collapsible trestle
- specialized equipment floating bridges

=== Armoured trains ===
The Railway Troops operates the largest fleet of armoured trains in active military service in the world. Four of these trains are known: Yenisei, Baikal, Volga and Amur. It is believed that more armoured trains are in service with the Railway Troops, but the existence of these trains has not been confirmed nor publicly announced.

== See also ==
- Awards and emblems of the Ministry of Defence of the Russian Federation
