= Call signs in Russia =

Call signs in Russia are unique identifiers for telecommunications and broadcasting. Call signs are regulated internationally by the ITU as well as nationally by Ministry of Communications and Mass Media of the Russian Federation. The latter is responsible for providing policy on the allocation of Russia's radio spectrum to support efficient, reliable and responsive wireless telecommunications and broadcasting infrastructure.

In 1991 Russia inherited the largest portion of the former Soviet Union's allocated call signs. The other post-USSR countries which inherited parts of the ITU UAA–UZZ call sign block are Uzbekistan, Kazakhstan, and Ukraine.

== Call sign blocks for telecommunication ==
The International Telecommunication Union has assigned Russia the following call sign blocks for all radio communication, broadcasting or transmission:

Call sign block	
RAA–RZZ	Russia
UAA–UIZ	Russia

While not directly related to call signs, the International Telecommunication Union (ITU) further has divided all countries assigned amateur radio prefixes into three regions; Russia is located in ITU Region 1.

== Call sign assignments for amateur radio ==
Amateur radio or ham radio call signs are unique identifiers for the 24,000 licensed operators.

Russia uses the following 1-letter and 2-letter prefixes in amateur radio call signs for normal operation: R, RA, RK, RN, RU, RV, RW, RX, RZ, and UA. Any of these prefixes can be used in any of Russia's federal subjects. The other prefixes are reserved for special operation.

It uses the numerals 1, 2, 3, 4, 5, 6, 7, 8, 9, and 0 to separate prefixes from suffixes, and to indicate in which of the six regions the amateur was assigned the call sign.

Russia uses the first letter of the suffix to designate a specific federal subject in each respective region. This means that for most call signs the numeral and first letter of the suffix identifies which federal subject the operator was licensed in.

Russia's amateur callsign number regions

=== Northwest Russia ===
1A	Saint Petersburg
1C	Leningrad
1D	Saint Petersburg
1N	Karelia
1O	Arkhangelsk
1P	Nenets
1Q	Vologda
1T	Novgorod
1W	Pskov
1Y	Murmansk
2F	Kaliningrad

=== Central Russia ===
3A	Moscow
3D	Moskovskaya
3E	Oryol
3F	Moskovskaya
3G	Lipetsk
3H	Moskovskaya
3I	Tver
3L	Smolensk
3M	Yaroslavl
3N	Kostroma
3P	Tula
3Q	Voronezh
3R	Tambov
3S	Ryazan
3T	Nizhny Novgorod
3U	Ivanovo
3V	Vladimir
3W	Kursk
3X	Kaluga
3Y	Bryansk
3Z	Belgorod

=== Volga River ===
4A	Volgograd
4C	Saratov
4F	Penza
4H	Samara
4L	Ulyanovsk
4N	Kirov
4P	Tatarstan
4S	Mari El
4U	Mordovia
4W	Udmurtia
4Y	Chuvashia

=== North Caucusus ===
6A	Krasnodar
6E	Karachay–Cherkessia
6F	Stavropol
6I	Kalmykia
6J	North Ossetia–Alania
6K	Crimea
6L	Rostov
6P	Chechnya
6Q	Ingushetia
6U	Astrakhan
6W	Dagestan
6X	Kabardino-Balkaria
6Y	Adygea
7R	Sevastopol

=== Urals and West Siberia ===
9A	Chelyabinsk
9C	Sverdlovsk
9F	Perm
9H	Tomsk
9J	Khanty–Mansi
9K	Yamalo-Nenets
9L	Tyumen
9M	Omsk
9O	Novosibirsk
9Q	Kurgan
9S	Orenburg
9U	Kemerovo
9W	Bashkortostan
9X	Komi
9Y	Altai Krai
9Z	Altai Republic

=== East Siberia and Pacific Coast ===
0A	Krasnoyarsk
0C	Khabarovsk
0D	Jewish Autonomous Oblast
0E	Sakhalin
0I	Magadan
0J	Amur
0K	Chukotka
0L	Primorskiy
0O	Buryatia
0Q	Sakha
0S	Irkutsk
0U	Zabaykalsky
0W	Khakassia
0Y	Tuva
0Z	Kamchatka

Combinations not listed are used by radio amateurs in the federal subject next to the listed combination immediately preceding it in the sort order; e.g., the 1B combination is used by radio amateurs in Saint Petersburg. Since 2010, call signs in the '3' region can also be issued with the numerals 2 and 5; in the '6' region with numeral 7; and in the '9' region with numeral 8.

=== Special call signs ===
- The second letter in a suffix: W, X, Y, Z – Club stations
- U1–4, 6, 9–0 World War II veterans
- U1MIR–U9MIR cosmonauts
- RI1ANA–RI1ANZ, RA00ANT–RI99ANT Antarctica, South Shetland Islands
- RI1FJA–RI1FJZ Franz Josef Land (Arctic)
- R1MVA–R1MVZ Maly Vysotsky Island (ex-4J1.)
- RA2, UA2–UI2 (F or K next letter) Kaliningrad Oblast
- R3ARES – Russian amateur radio emergency service H.Q (RARES), Moscow.
- RE0RAS – RARES, Regional service. Central Siberia, Krasnoyarsk.
- R3ARC – H.Q. Rescue service of Russian Red Cross. Moscow.
- R3RRC – "Russian Robinson Club" H.Q. Lipetsk city (R3G area).
- R3SRR – Russian Amateur Radio Union H.Q. Moscow.
- R3VHF – VHF Committee of Russian Amateur Radio Union.
- RS0ISS – Cosmonauts on the International Space Station.

== History of call sign allocation ==
Russia was not a signatory to the 1913 Berlin agreement but received the R block series. Amateur radio was not yet developed enough to be subject to this identification scheme.

In 1927 the International Telecommunication Union Conference in Washington (D.C., USA) established internally agreed upon call sign prefixes – Russia was now in the USSR and the latter was assigned the RAA–RZZ block.

At the 1947 Atlantic City ITU Conference, the USSR was assigned the following call sign blocks:

Call sign block	1947 Assignment	Present assignment
DRA–DTZ	Bielorussian Soviet Socialist Republic	Germany (DR), South Korea (DS–DT)
EKA–EKZ	Union of Soviet Socialist Republics	Armenia
EMA–EOZ	Union of Soviet Socialist Republics	Ukraine (EM–EO)
ERA–ERZ	Union of Soviet Socialist Republics	Moldova
ESA–ESZ	Estonia	Estonia
EUA–EZZ	Union of Soviet Socialist Republics	Belarus (EU–EY), Turkmenistan (EZ)
LYA–LYZ	Lithuania	Lithuania
RAA–RZZ	Union of Soviet Socialist Republics	Russia
UAA–UQZ	Union of Soviet Socialist Republics	Russia (UA–UI), Uzbekistan (UJ–UM), Kazakhstan (UN–UQ)
URA–UTZ	Ukrainian Soviet Socialist Republic	Ukraine (UR–UZ)
UUA–UZZ	Union of Soviet Socialist Republics	Ukraine
YLA–YLZ	Latvia	Latvia
4JA–4LZ	Union of Soviet Socialist Republics	Azerbaijan (4J–4K), Georgia (4L)

As of 2010, several call sign codes were deleted or merged following the merger of the corresponding entity with a neighbouring subject of the Russian Federation between 2005 and 2008:

- 9G (the Komi-Permyak Autonomous Okrug) merged with 9F (Perm Oblast) to become Perm Krai which uses both 9F and 9G
- 8T (the Ust-Orda Buryat Autonomous Okrug) merged with 0S, 0T Irkutsk Oblast
- 8V (the Agin-Buryat Autonomous Okrug) merged with 0U, 0V (Chita Oblast) to become Zabaykalsky Krai
- 0B (the Taymyr Autonomous Okrug) and 0H (the Evenk Autonomous Okrug) merged with 0A (Krasnoyarsk Krai)
- 0X (the Koryak Autonomous Okrug) merged with 0Z (Kamchatka Oblast) to become 0X, 0Z (Kamchatka Krai)

=== Japan/USSR Disputed areas – WWII ===
Sakhalin Island has been disputed between Russia/USSR and Japan since the mid-19th century. From 1905 until after World War II, South Sakhalin Island was under Japanese control and was assigned the JP7 call sign prefix for radio purposes. From 1945 until the present the call sign prefix for all of Sahalin Island is UA0, with F as the first letter of the suffix. The Japan-Soviet Joint Declaration of 1956 laid down that Habomai Is. and Shikotan I. should be returnable to Japan, but Russia is still the administrative authority in the Four Northern Islands.

=== Germany/USSR Disputed areas – WWII ===
While not strictly a Russian call sign issue, following World War II, Byelorussia inherited the DR–DT block at the Atlantic City Conference from the German D-block. The block was then transferred back to Germany, and the DS–DT block subsequently given to South Korea.

== See also ==
- Amateur radio international operation
- Call signs
- ITU prefix - amateur and experimental stations
- Amateur radio license
- Russian Government Ministry of Communications resolution No 4 2012 - Regulation of Russian callsigns since 2012 (in Russian)
