= ChME3 =

Diesel locomotive with electric transmission built by ČKD

ČME3 ЧМЭ3 and others
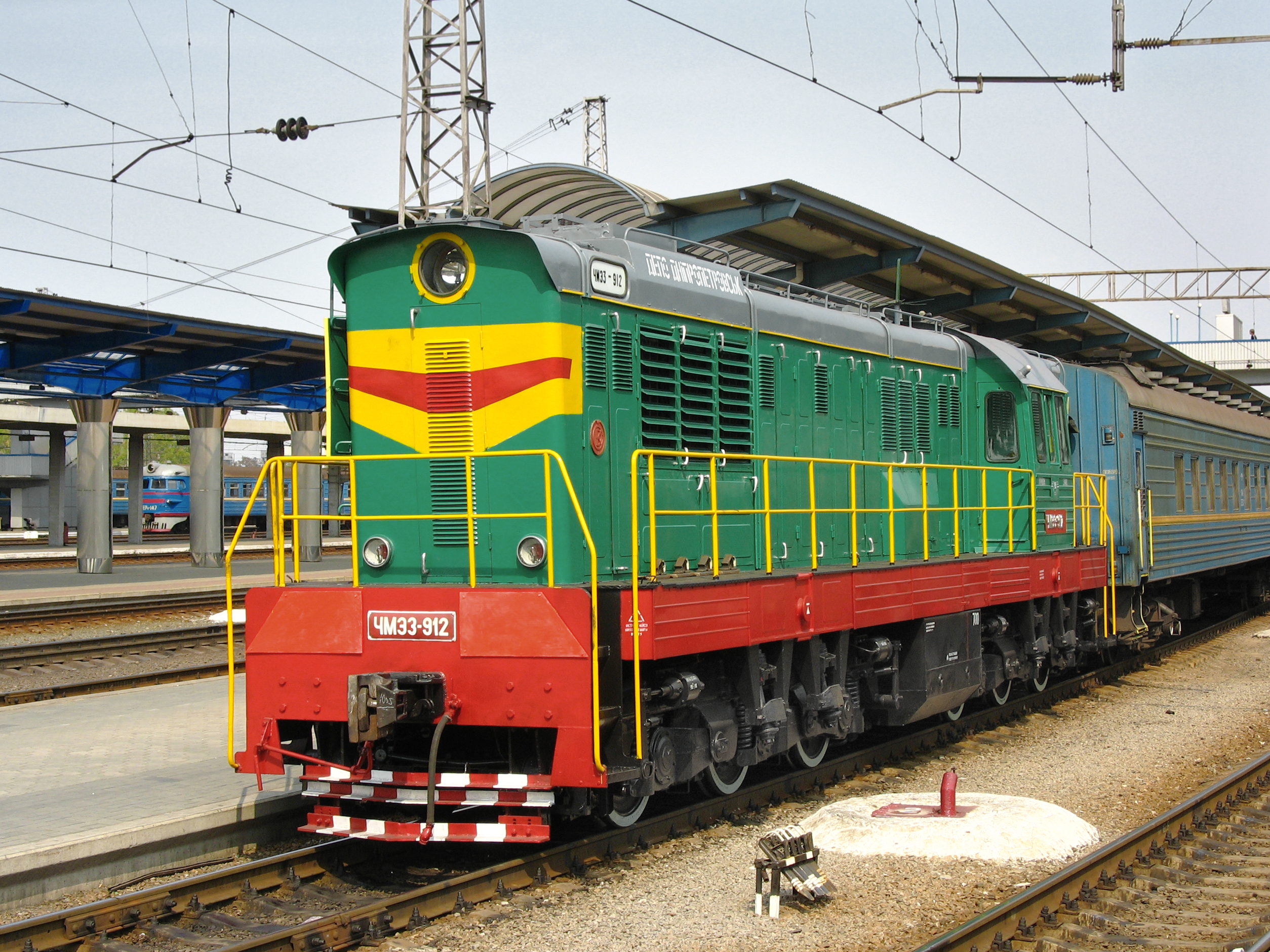
- ЧМЭ3-912 at Dnipro railway station
Type and origin
- Power type: Diesel–electric
- Builder: ČKD
- Build date: 1963–1994
- Total produced: 8,200
Specifications
- Configuration
  - UIC: Co'Co'
- Gauge: 1,435 mm (4 ft 8 1/2 in) standard gauge 1,520 mm (4 ft 11 27/32 in) Russian gauge 1,676 mm (5 ft 6 in)
- Wheel diameter: 1,050 mm (41.34 in)
- Minimum curve: 80 m (262 ft)
- Wheelbase: 8,660 mm (28 ft 5 in)
- Length: 17,220 mm (56 ft 6 in)
- Axle load: 21 t (21 long tons; 23 short tons)
- Loco weight: 126 t (124 long tons; 139 short tons)
- Fuel type: Diesel
- Fuel consumption: 220 g/(kW⋅h) (2.2 oz/MJ; 5.8 oz/(hp⋅h))
- Prime mover: ČKD K 6 S 310 DR
- RPM range: 750
- Engine type: Straight-six Diesel engine
- Generator: ČKD TD 802 B
- Traction motors: ČKD TE 006 6x
- Cylinders: 6
- Cylinder size: 310 mm × 360 mm (12.20 in × 14.17 in)
- Transmission: Electric
- MU working: yes
Performance figures
- Maximum speed: 95 km/h (59 mph)
- Power output: 1,000 kW (1,300 hp)
- Tractive effort: 265 kN (60,000 lb_{f}); Max 362 kN (81,000 lb_{f})

The ČKD ČME3 is a six-axle diesel–electric locomotive built by ČKD. The class was used primarily for shunting and mainline duties. With over 8,000 produced during a production run of 31 years, it is one of the most produced locomotives in the world. Units have been operated by Russia and Belarus (as class ЧМЭ3, transliteration ChME3), as well as Ukraine (ЧМЕ3) and other ex-Soviet bloc countries, in Czechoslovakia (as class T669.0, T669.1 and T669.5, later as ŽSR 770 and ČD 770 in Slovakia and the Czech Republic), on industrial railways in Poland (S200), in Albania (HSH T669.1), Iraq (DES 3101), Syria (LDE 1500) and in India (DEC 120).

The ČKD ČME3 is classified as a Co-Co or C-C diesel–electric locomotive, with all six axles powered. As such, it is particularly suited for pulling heavy, slow freight and cargo trains.

== Gallery ==
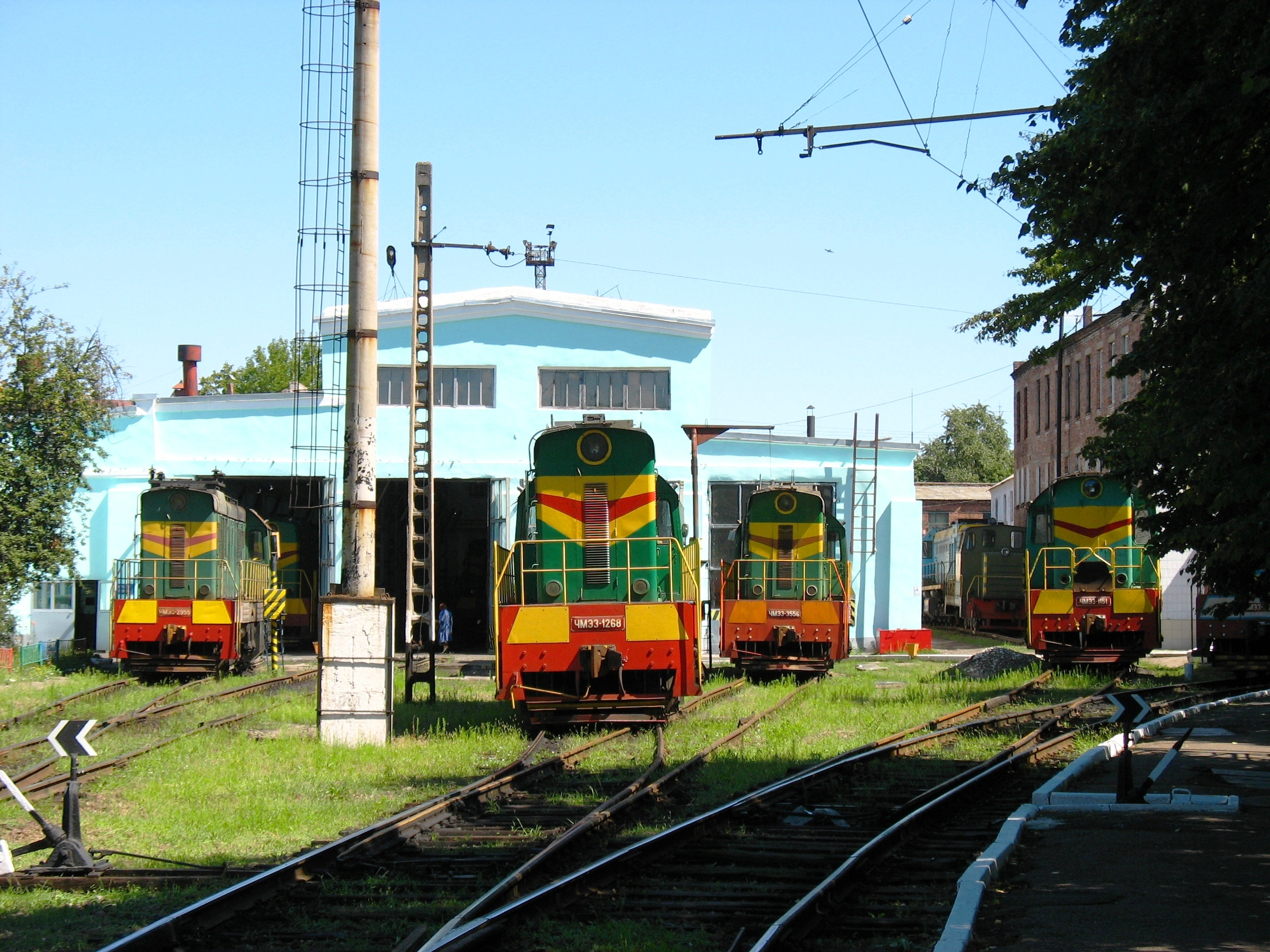
ČME3 in depot Sloviansk, Ukrainian Railways

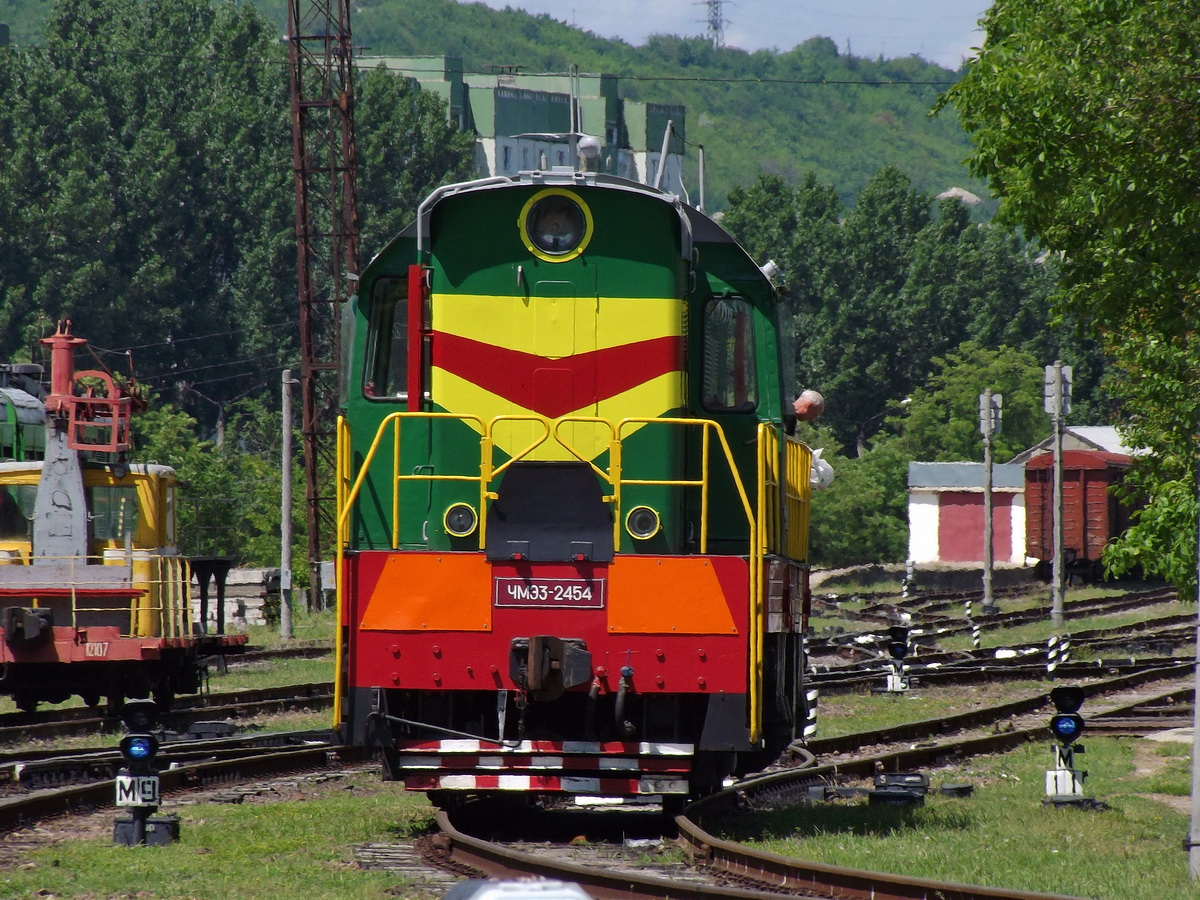
ČME3-2454, Transnistrian Railway

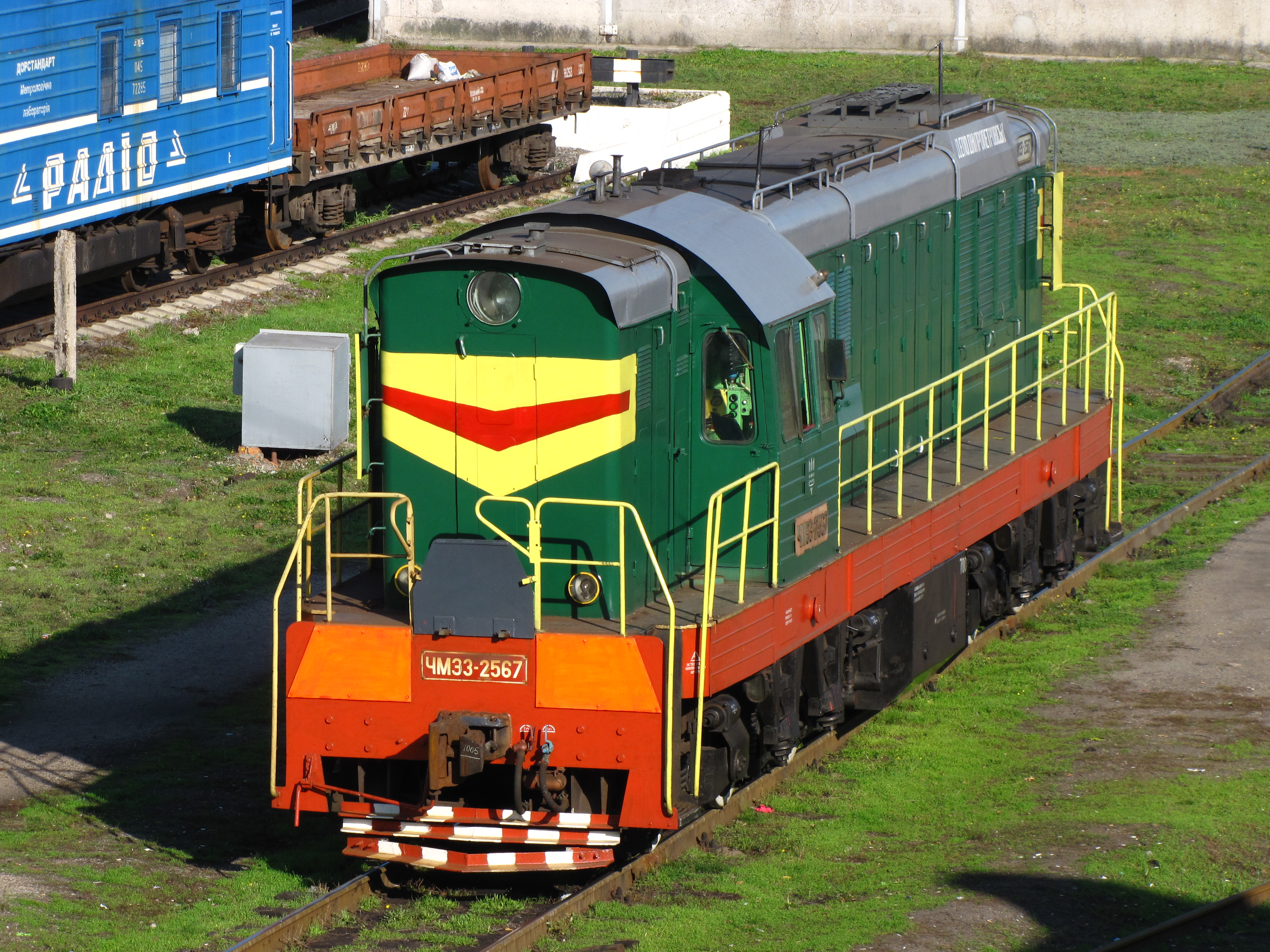
ČME3-2567, Dnipro railway station, Ukrainian Railways

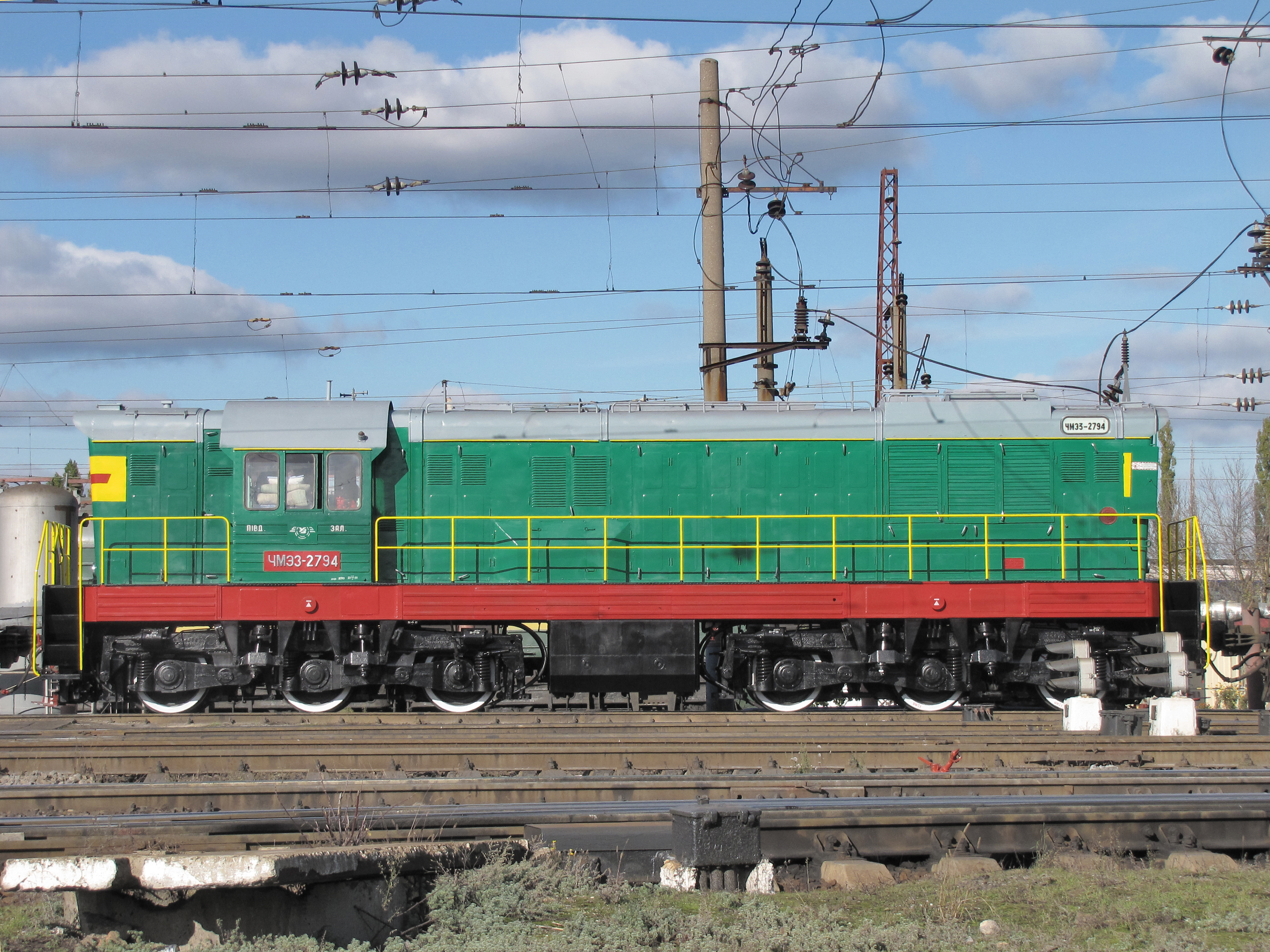
ČME3-2794, Ukrainian Railways

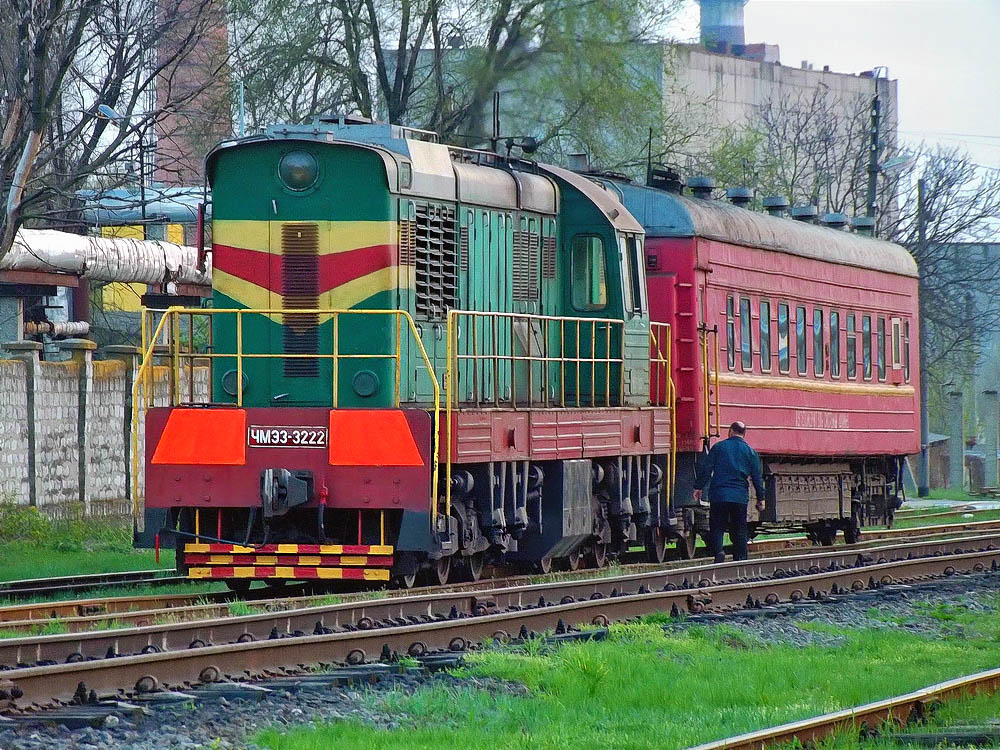
ČME3-3222, Calea Ferată din Moldova

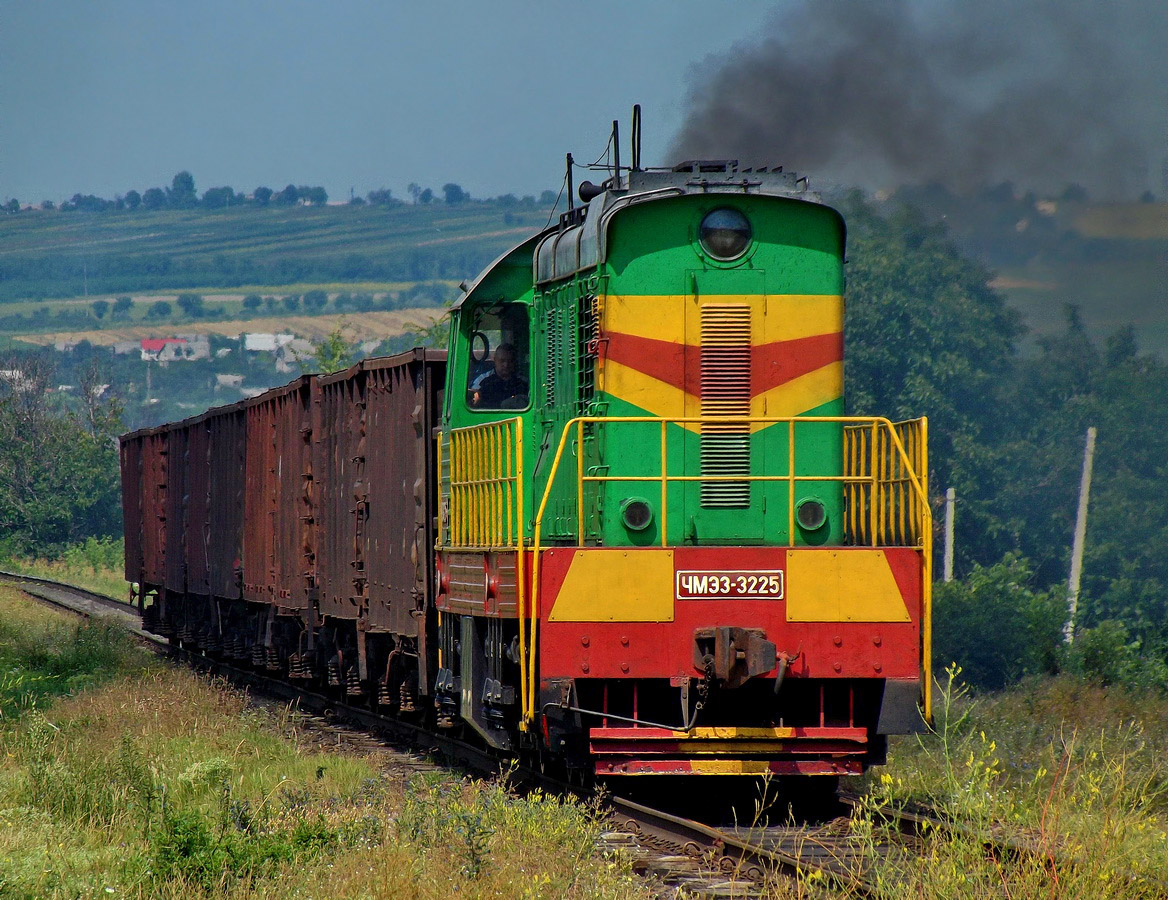
ČME3-3225, Calea Ferată din Moldova

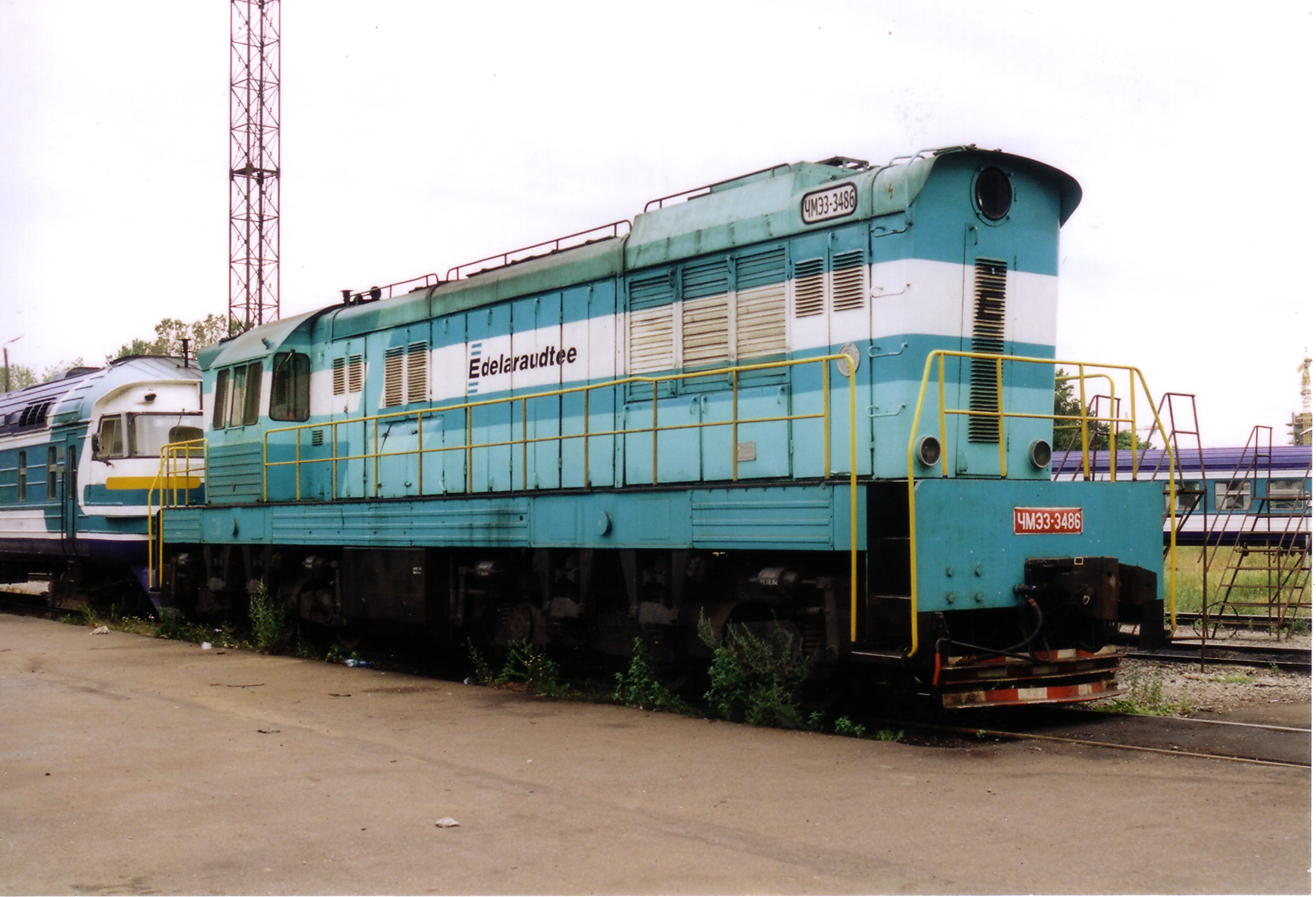
ČME3-3486, Edelaraudtee

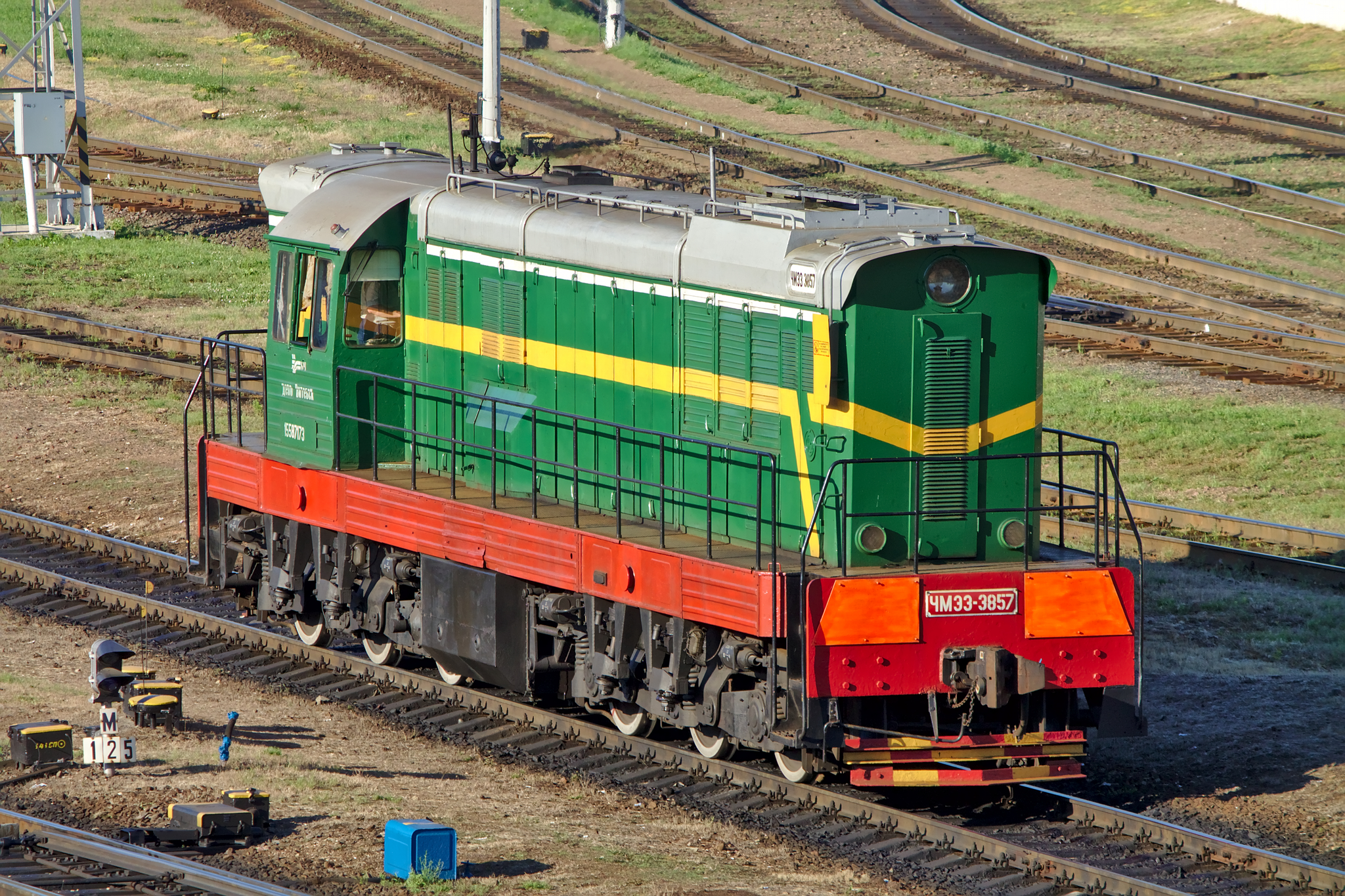
ČME3-3857, Belarusian Railway

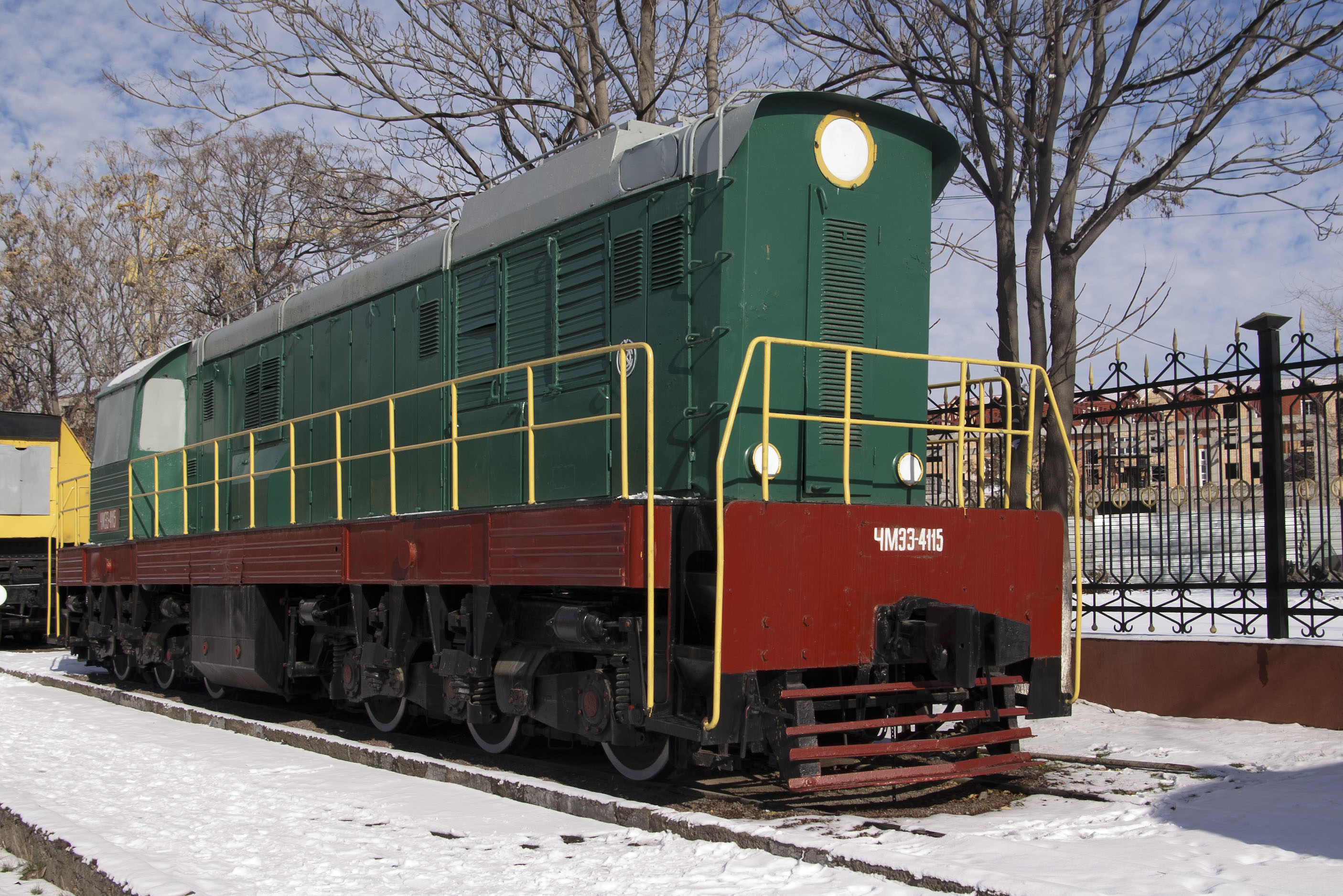
ČME3-4115, Tashkent Museum of Railway Techniques

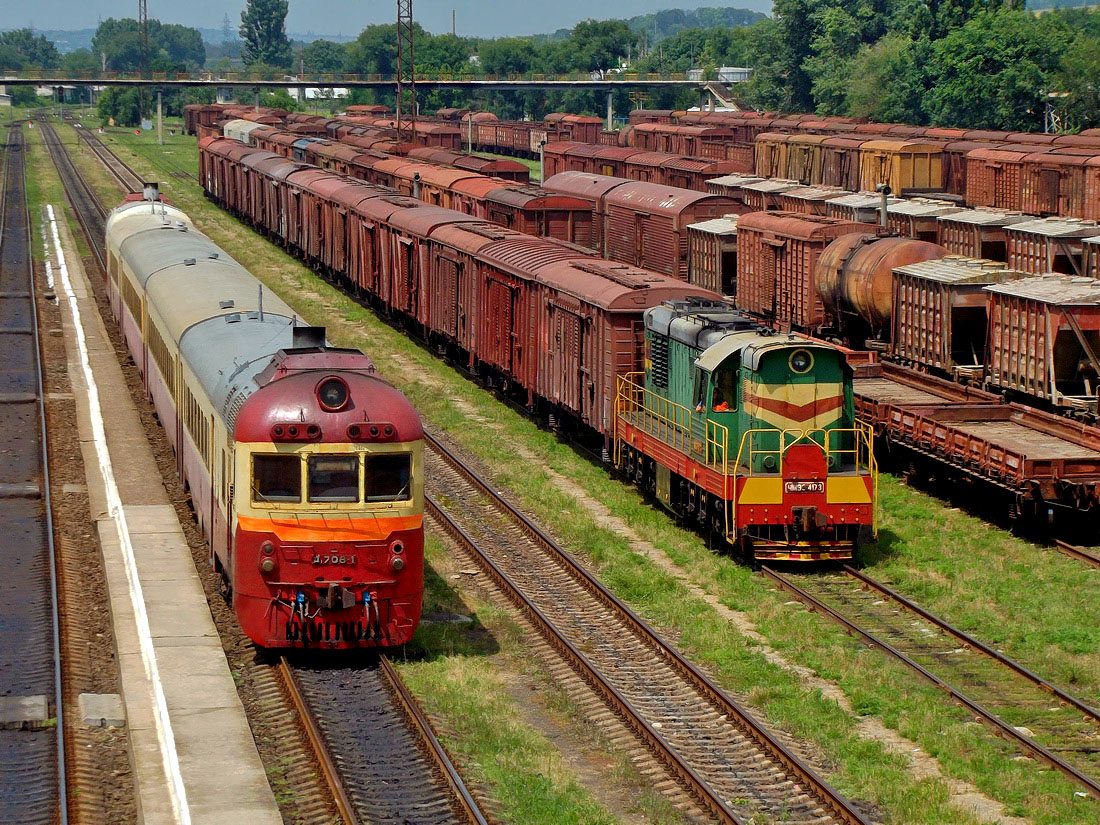
D1 multiple unit-708 and ČME3-4173, Calea Ferată din Moldova

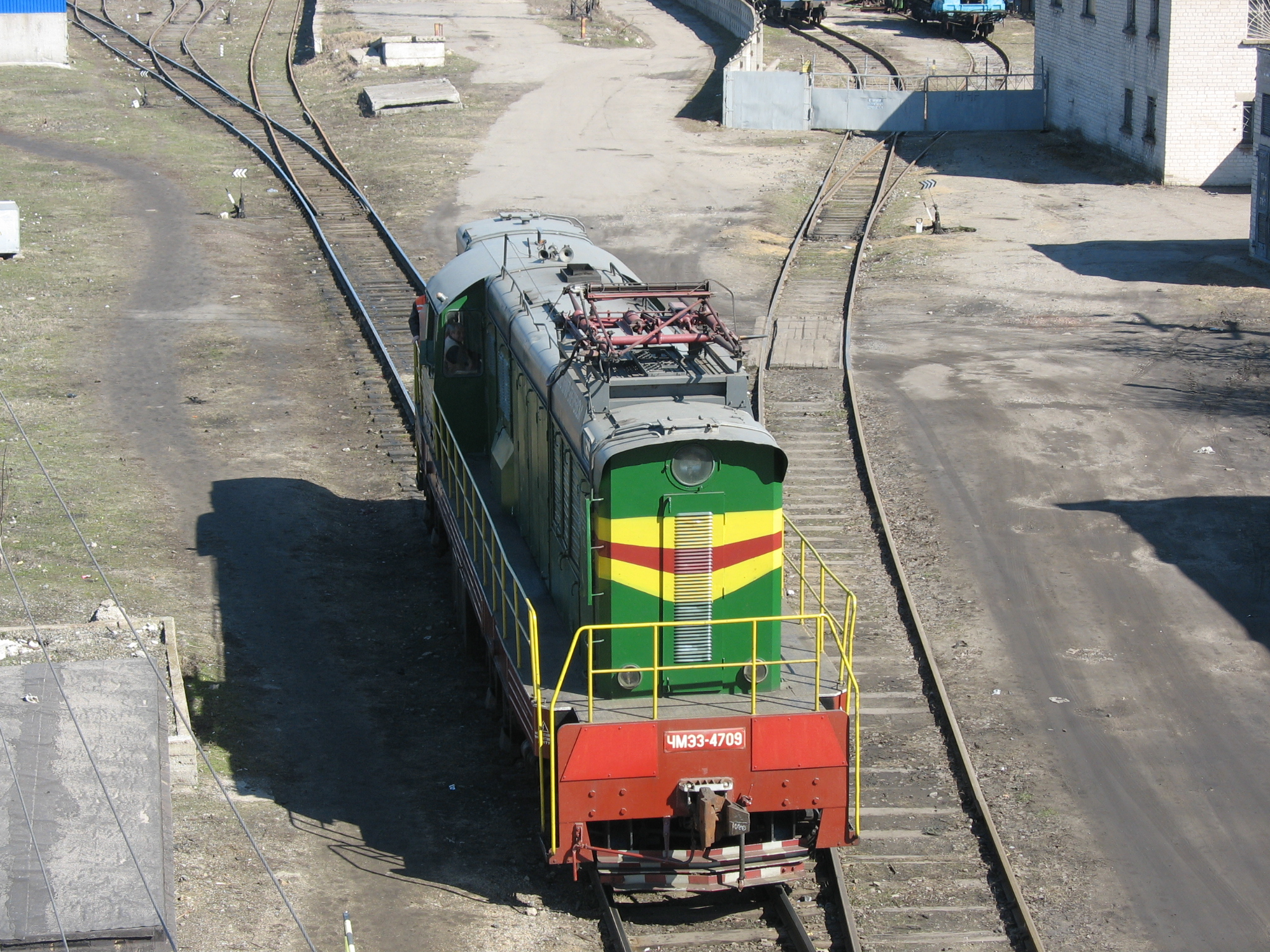
ČME3-4709, Dnipro railway station, Ukrainian Railways

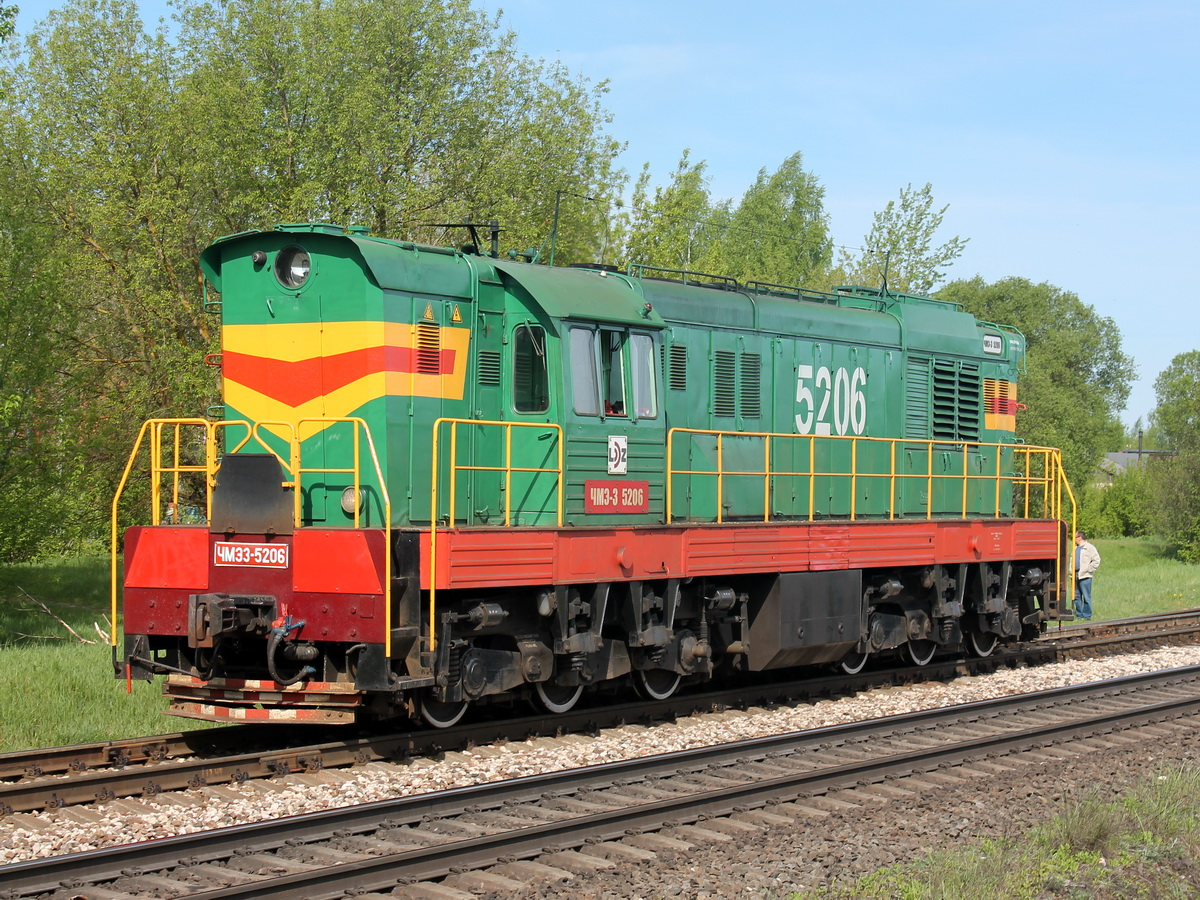
ČME3-5206, Latvian Railways

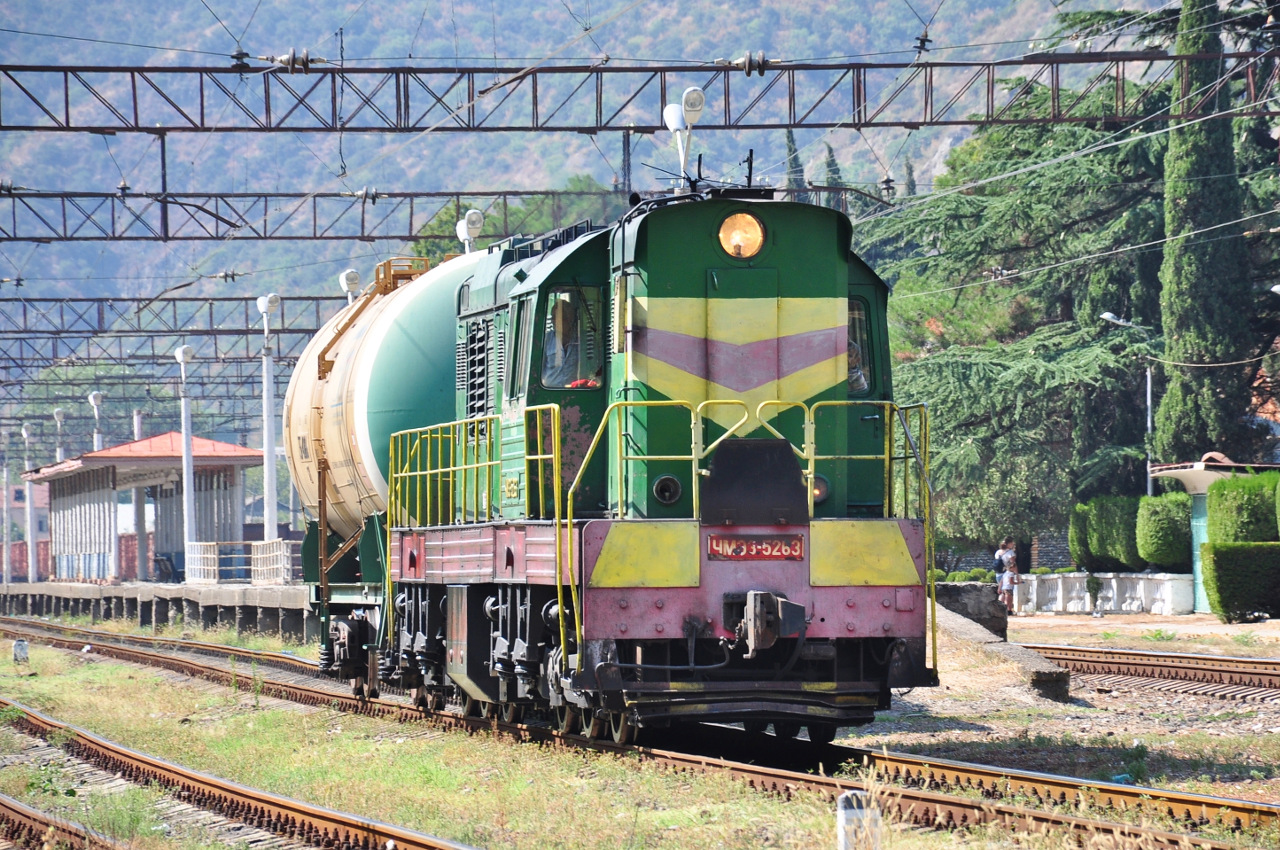
ČME3-5263, Georgian Railway

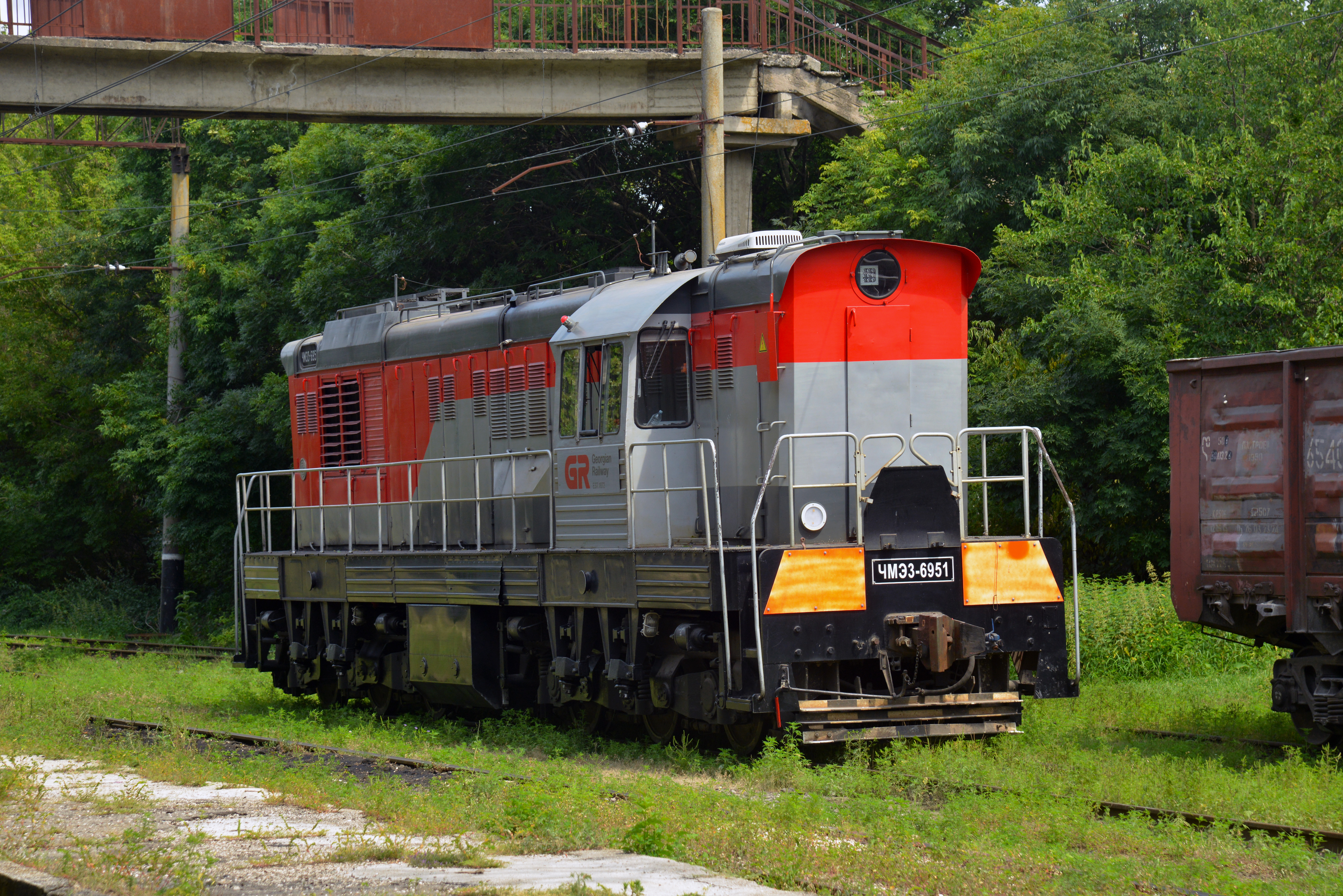
ČME3-6951 Georgian Railway in newer color scheme

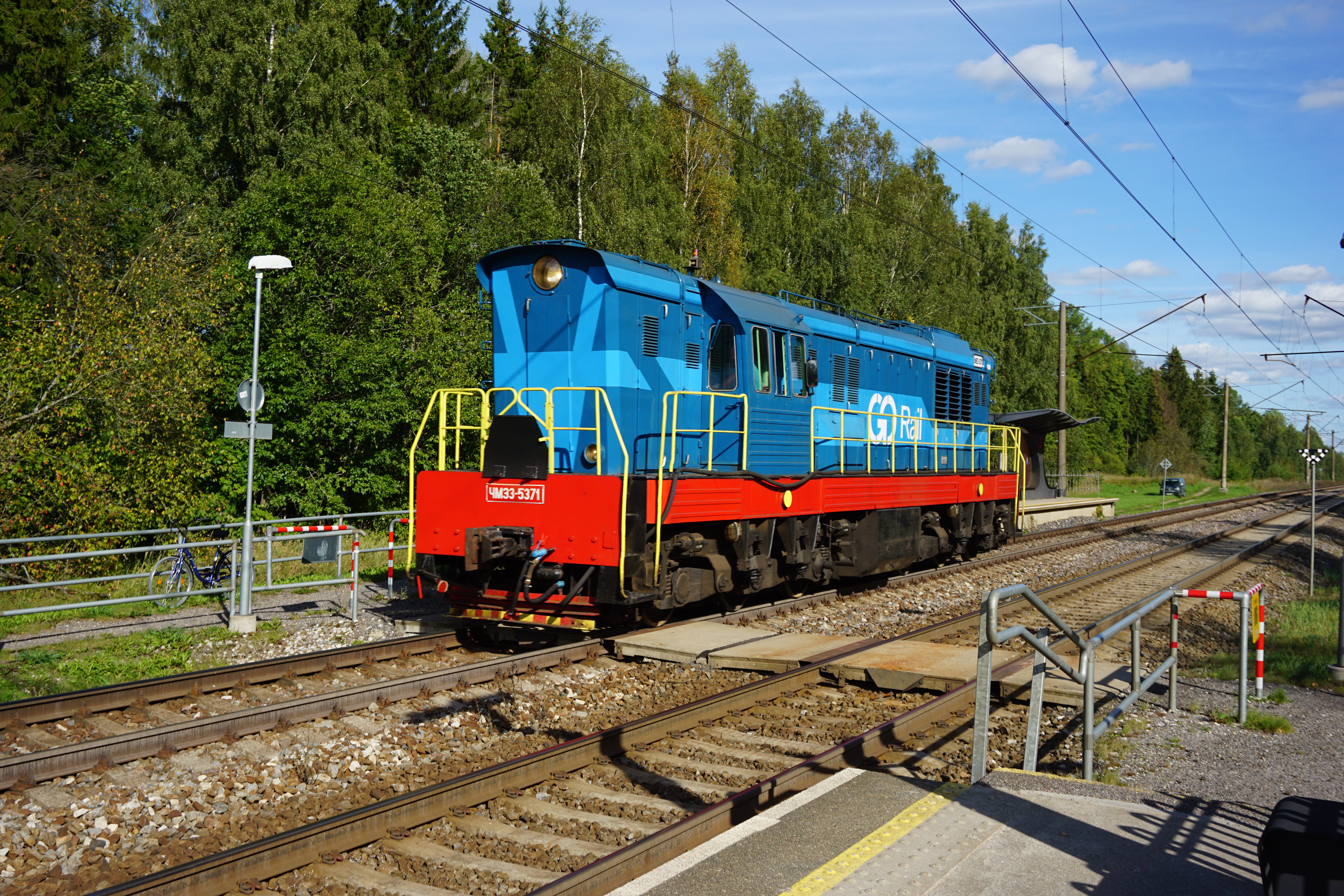
ČME3-5371, GoRail

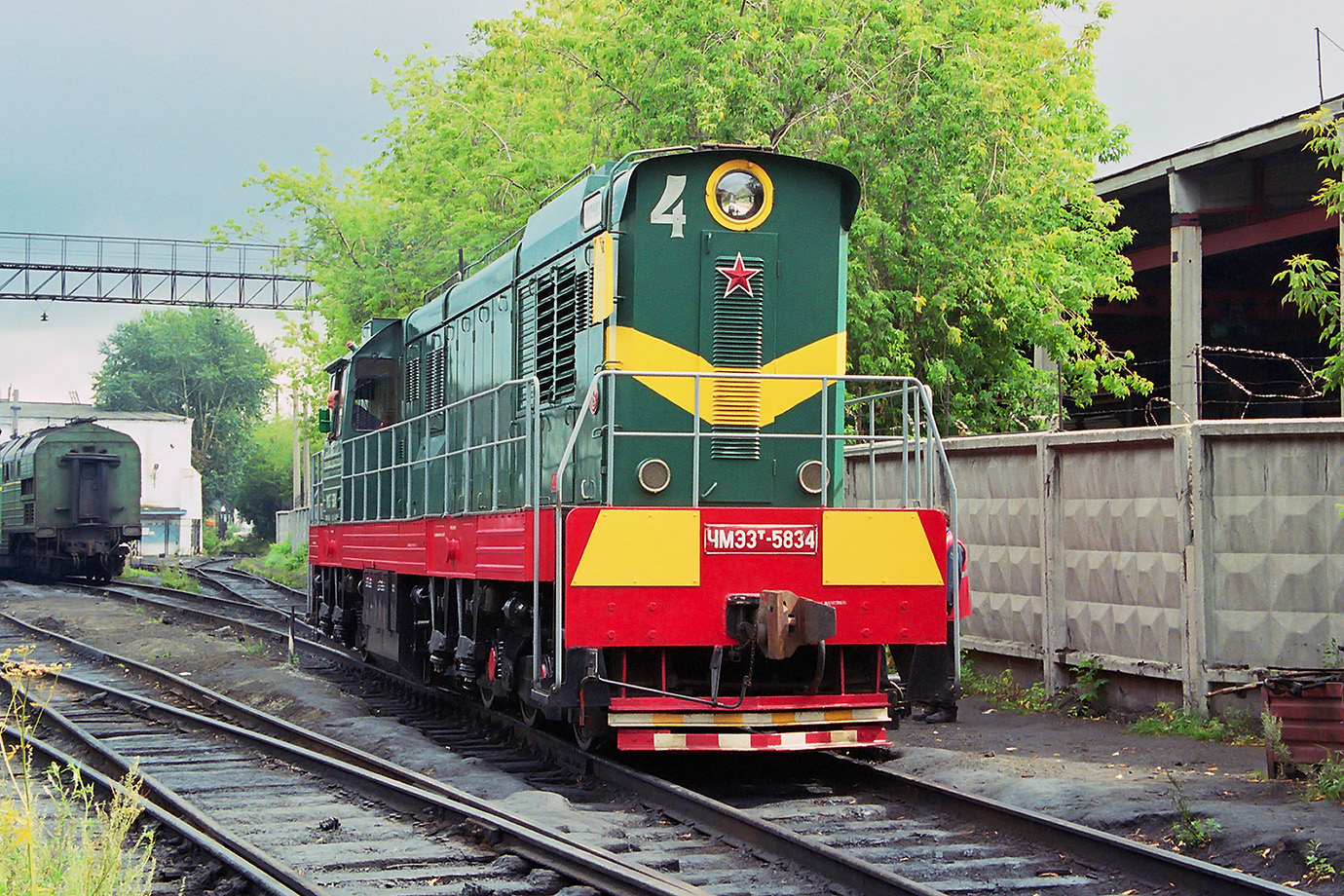
ČME3^{Т}-5834, Russian Railways

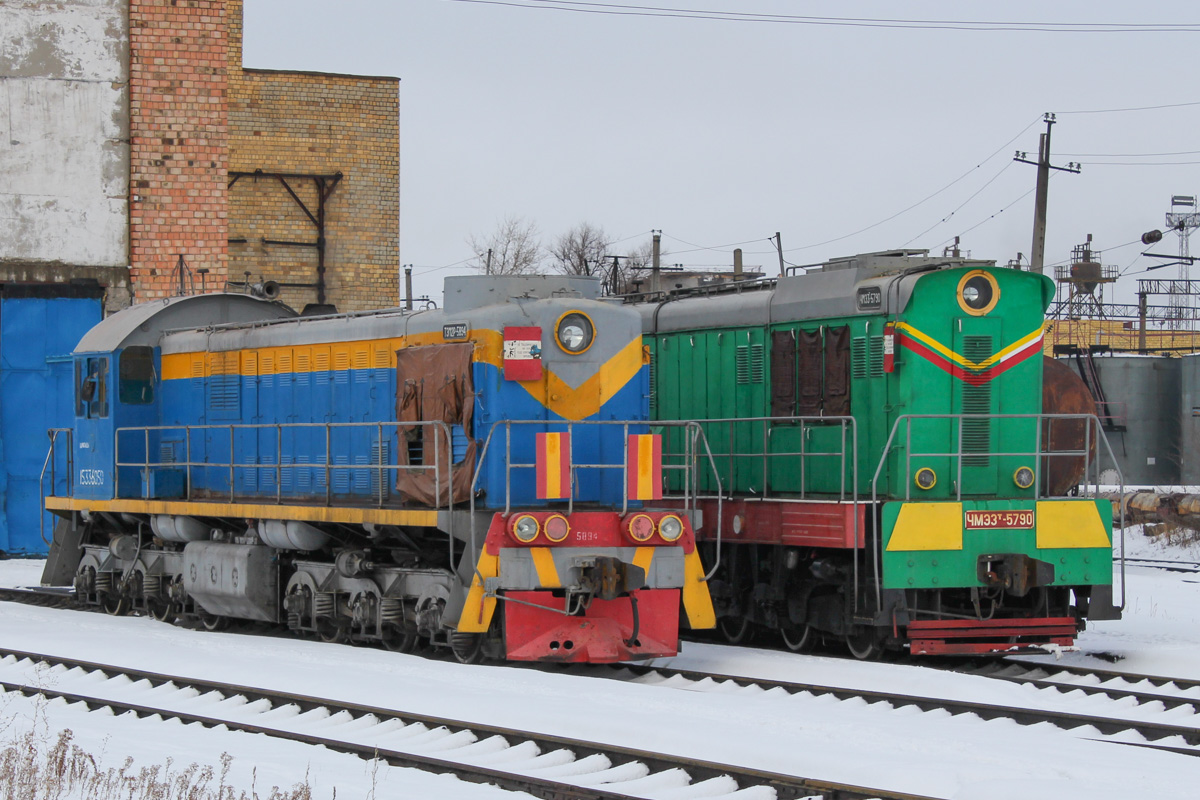
TEM2-5894 and ČME3^{Т}-5790, Kazakhstan Temir Joly

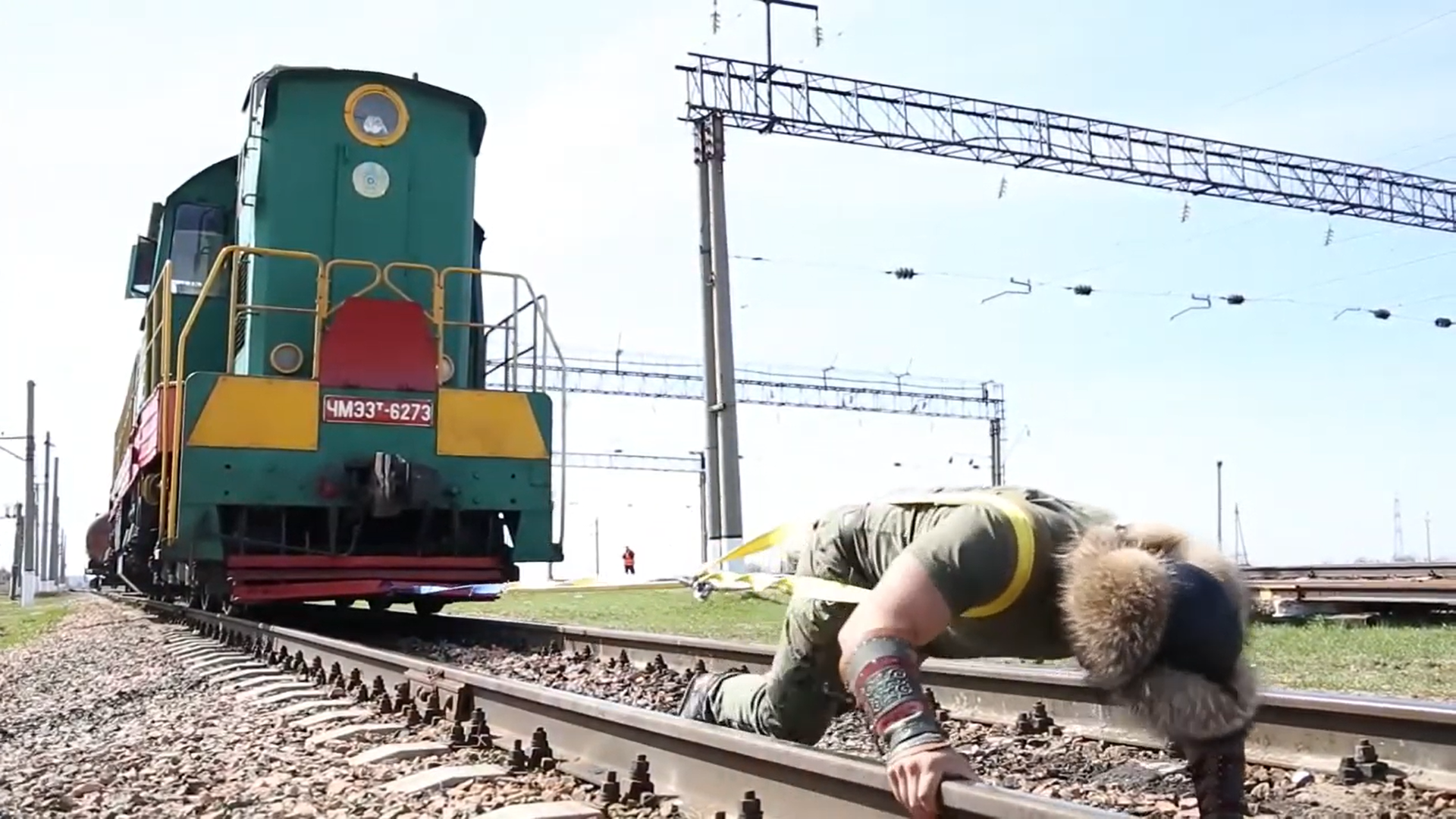
ČME3-6273, Kazakhstan Temir Joly

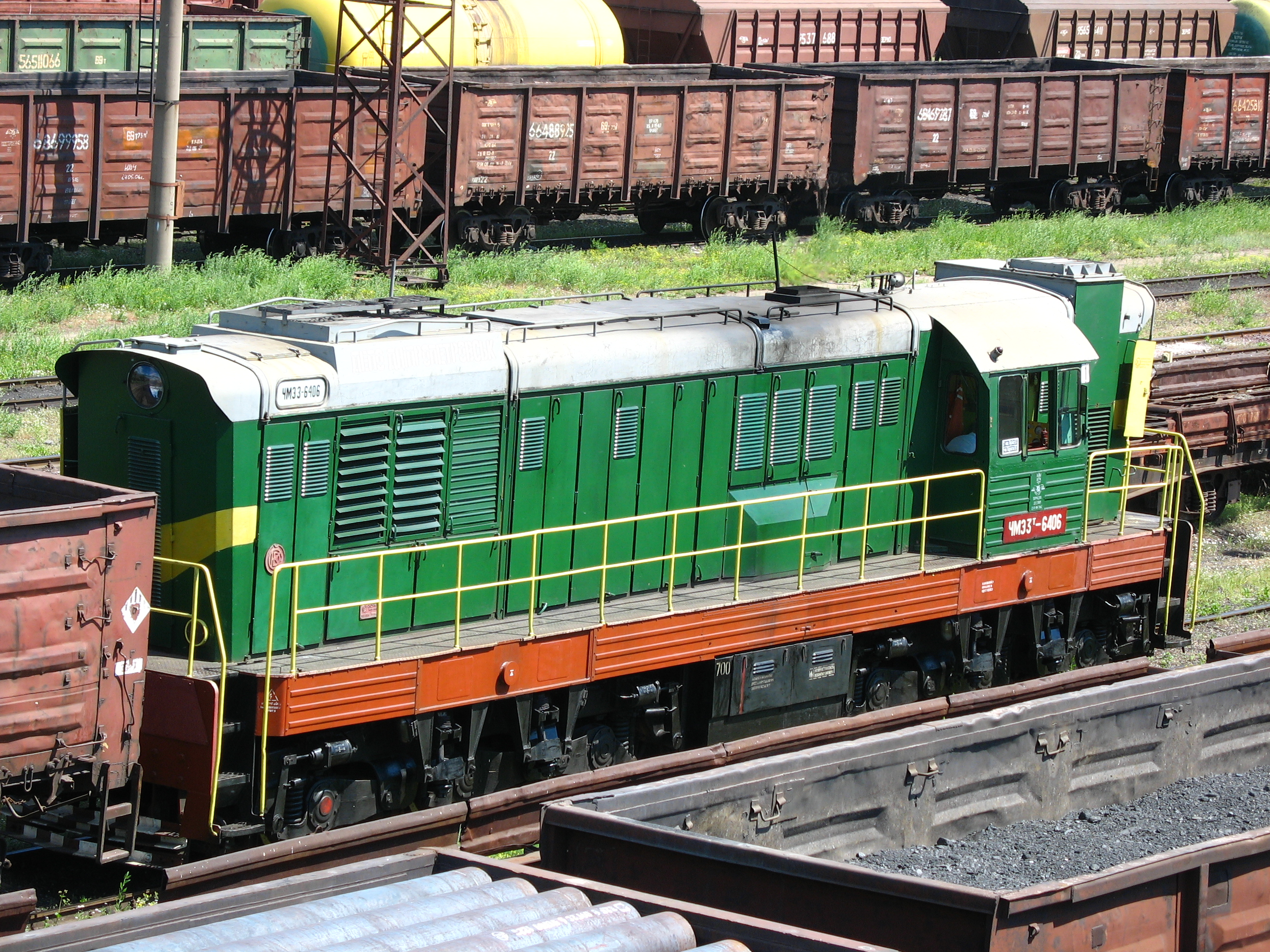
ČME3^{Т}-6406, Ukrainian Railways

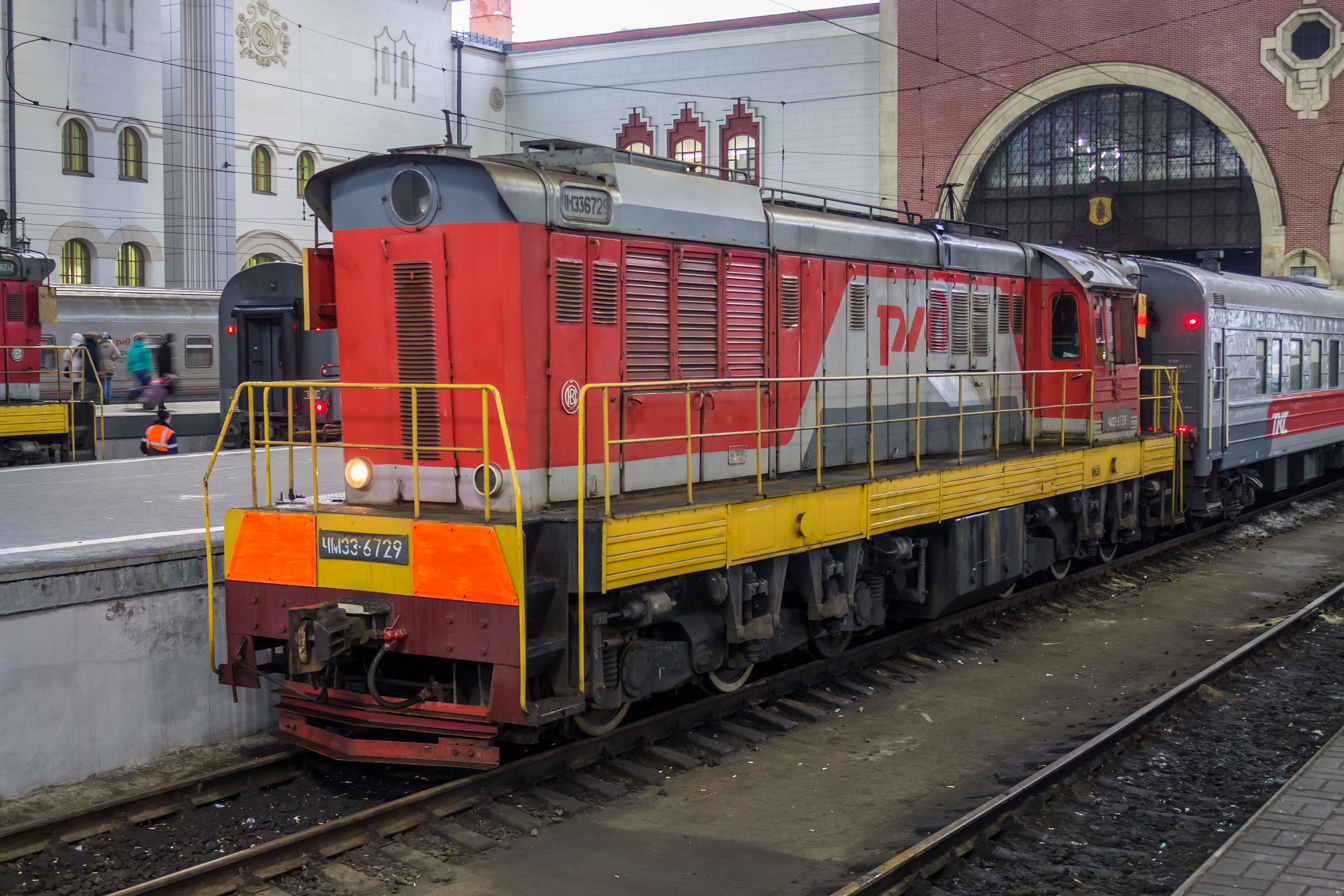
ČME3-6729, Russian Railways

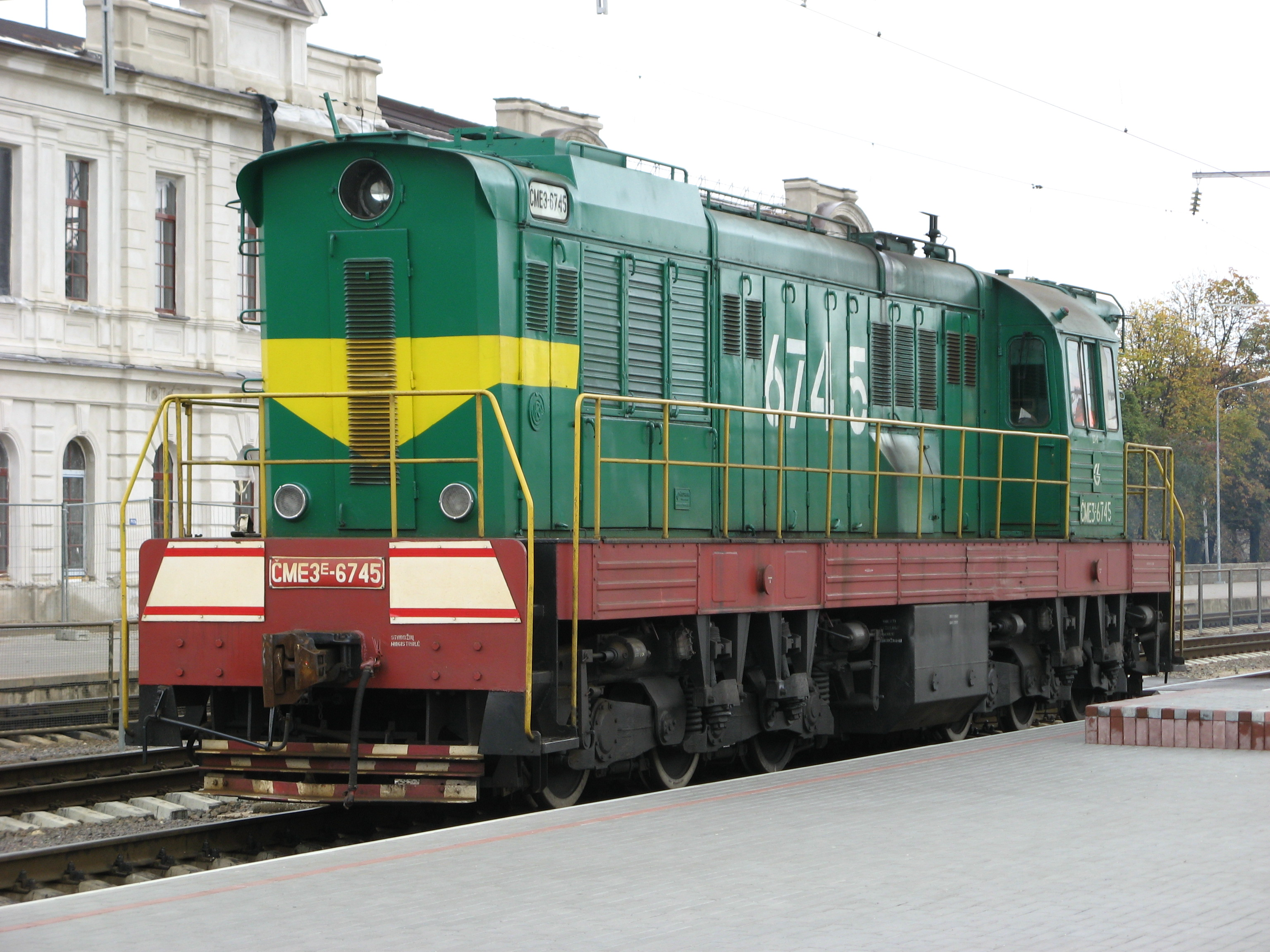
ČME3^{E}-6745, Lithuanian Railways

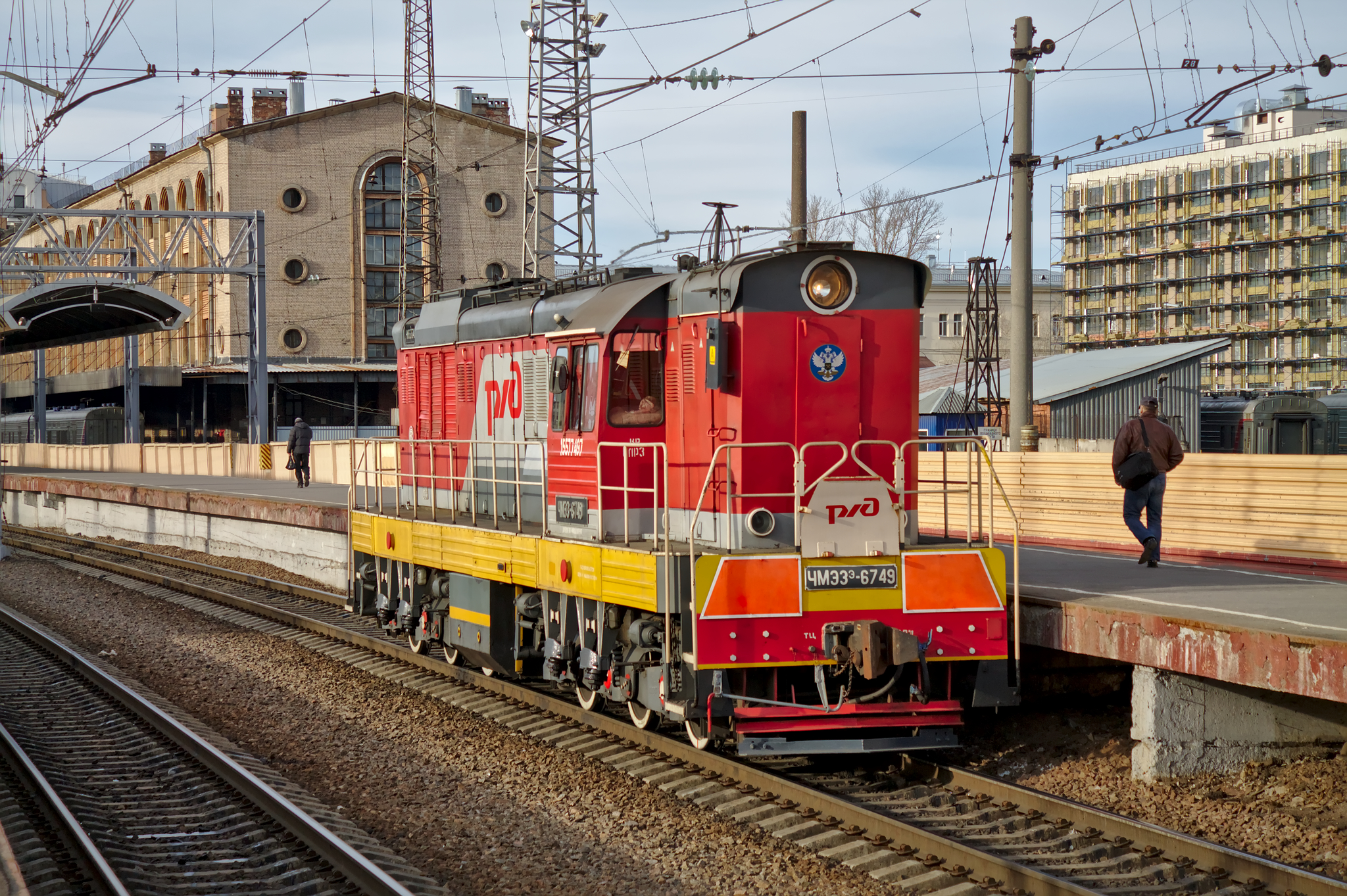
ČME3^{E}-6749, Russian Railways

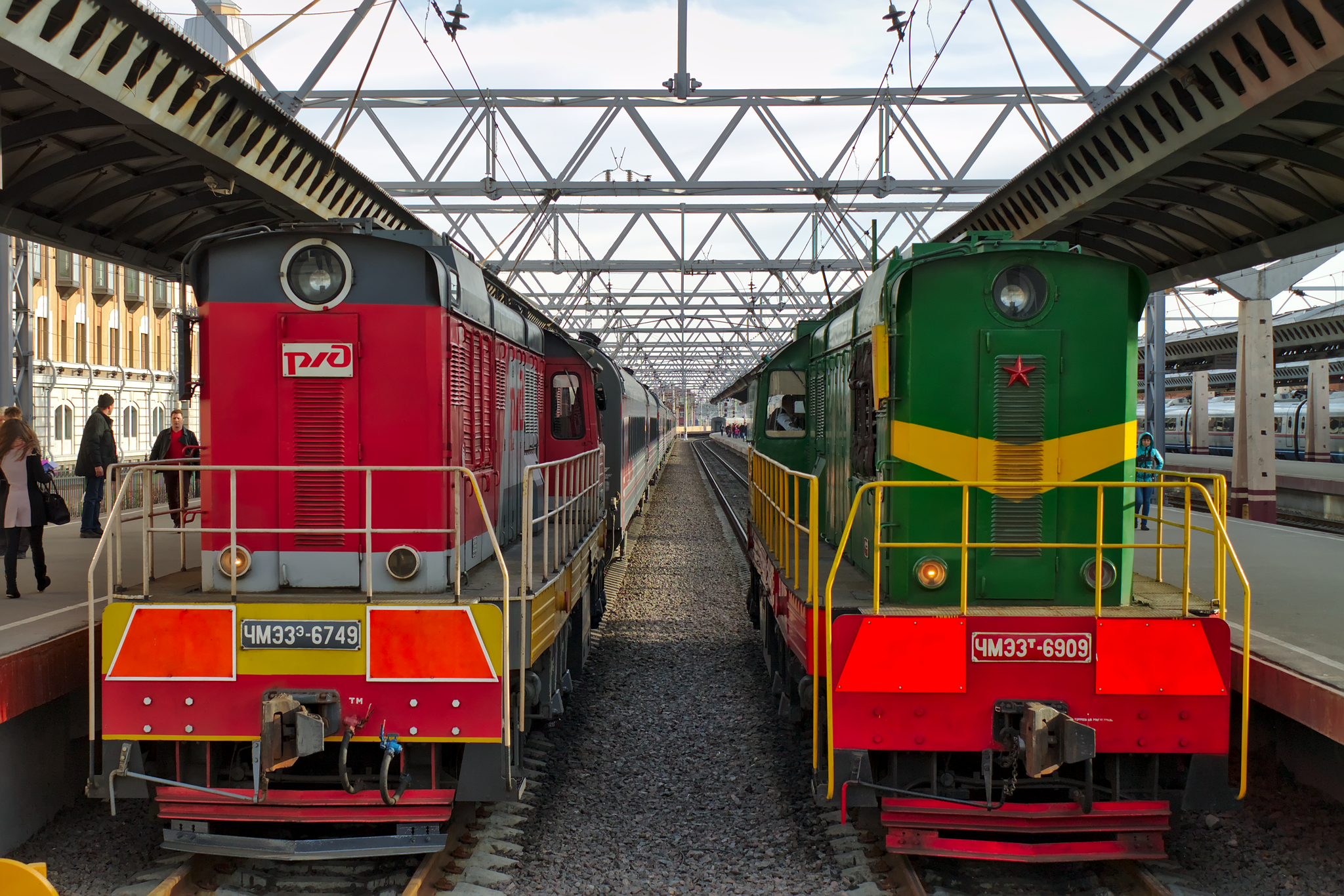
ČME3^{E}-6749 and ČME3^{Т}-6909, Russian Railways

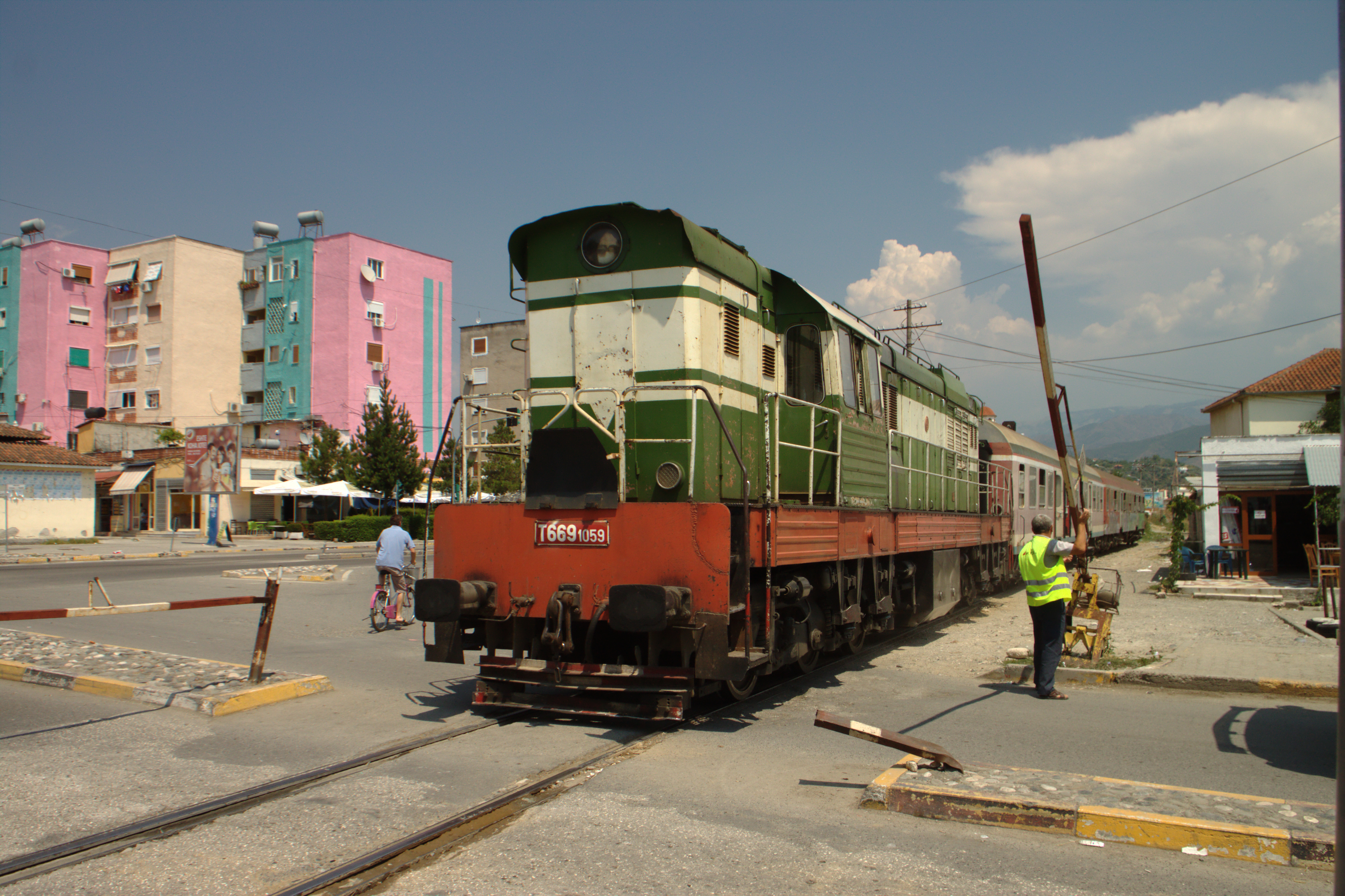
ČME3/T669, Hekurudha Shqiptare

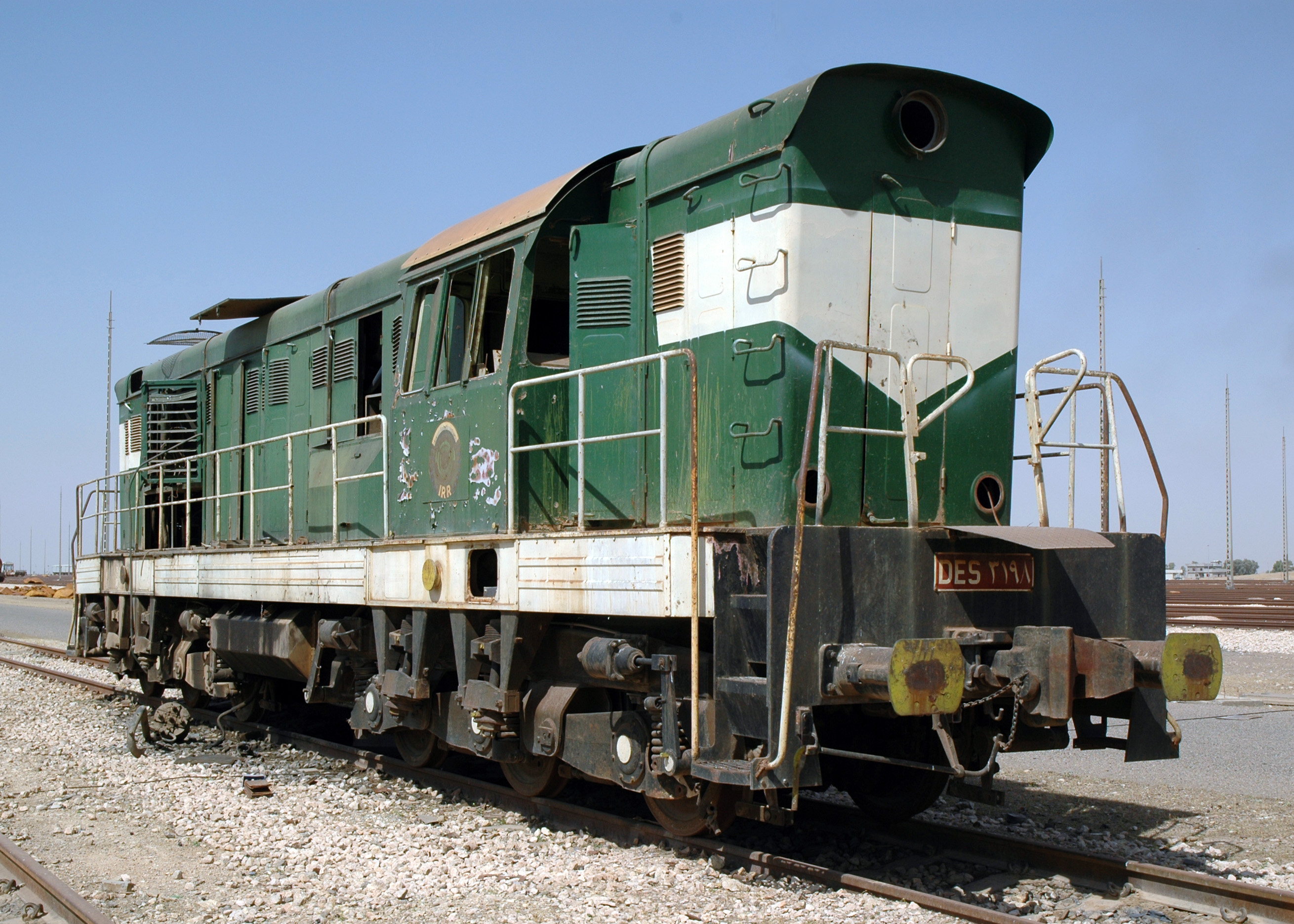
DES 3100, Iraqi Republic Railways
