= Stefanik =

Stefanik, Stefanic, Stefanick or Štefánik are Slavic surnames. Hungarian variant: Stefanics. Notable people with the name include:

- Milan Rastislav Štefánik (1880–1919), Slovak politician
  - Armored train Štefánik, train used in Slovakia during World War II
  - M. R. Štefánik Airport, airport in Bratislava, Slovakia
- Elise Stefanik (born 1984), American politician
- Jason Stefanik, Canadian poet
- Marcia Stefanick, American medical researcher
- Marcin Stefanik (born 1987), Polish footballer
- Michael Stefanic (born 1996), American baseball player
- Mike Stefanik (1958–2019), American stock car racing driver
- Samuel Štefánik (born 1991), Slovak footballer
