= Andra =

Andra may refer to:

== People ==
- Andra (singer) (born 1986), Romanian singer
- Andra (musician), Zimbabwean-American musician
- Andra Blomkalns, American emergency physician
- Andra Gillespie, American political scientist
- Andra Karpin (born 1979), Estonian footballer
- Andra Neiburga (1957–2019), Latvian writer
- Andra Day (born 1984), American R&B singer
- Andra Samoa, American Samoan chief executive and environmentalist
- Andra Veidemann (born 1955), Estonian historian, ethnologist, editor, diplomat, and politician
- Andra Whiteside (born 1989), Fijian badminton player

== Other ==
- Andra (novel), a 1971 novel by Louise Lawrence
  - Andra (television programme), a 1976 ABC-TV Australian children's programme based on the novel
- Andra, Russia, an urban-type settlement in Khanty–Mansi Autonomous Okrug, Russia
- Andra, Vizianagaram, a village in Andhra Pradesh, India
- Agence nationale pour la gestion des déchets radioactifs (Andra), French agency for nuclear waste
- Australian National Drag Racing Association, (ANDRA)

== See also ==
- Andhra (disambiguation)
