= Investigative Radiology =

- Discipline: Radiology
- Language: English
- Edited by: Val Murray Runge

Publication details
- History: 1966-present
- Publisher: Wolters Kluwer
- Frequency: Monthly
- Impact factor: 8.0 (2024)

Standard abbreviations
- ISO 4: Investig. Radiol.
- NLM: Invest Radiol

Indexing
- CODEN: INVRAV
- ISSN: 0020-9996 (print); 1536-0210 (web)
- OCLC no.: 730022217

Links
- Journal homepage; Online access; Online archive

Investigative Radiology is a monthly peer-reviewed medical journal published by Wolters Kluwer. Its editor-in-chief is Val Murray Runge. The journal covers research on radiology and diagnostic imaging, focusing on magnetic resonance, computed tomography, ultrasound, digital subtraction angiography, and new technologies. An additional focus is that of contrast media research, primarily for diagnostic imaging.

== History ==
The journal was established in 1966 with S. David Rockoff as the founding editor until 1976. Other editors have been Richard H. Greenspan (1976-1984), Charles E. Putman (1984-1989), and Bruce J. Hillman (1990-1994). Val M. Runge (Inselspital, Universitätsspital Bern) has served as editor since 1994.

The journal was originally published by J.B. Lippincott (now part of Wolters Kluwer). Between 1966 and 1984 the journal appeared bimonthly but the frequency was increased to 9 issues in 1985, and to monthly in 1986. Each year, one or more special issues are published focusing on a single topic.

== Abstracting and indexing ==
The journal is abstracted and indexed in the Science Citation Index, Current Contents/Clinical Medicine, Current Contents/Life Sciences, BIOSIS Previews, and Index Medicus/MEDLINE/PubMed. According to the Journal Citation Reports, the journal has a 2023 impact factor of 7.0.
