= Laura Roberts =

American psychiatrist and bioethicist

- Born: 1960 (age 65–66)
- Education: University of Chicago
- Scientific career
- Fields: Psychiatry, bioethics
- Workplaces: University of New Mexico; Medical College of Wisconsin; Stanford University
- Website: laurarobertsmd.com

Laura Weiss Roberts (born 1960) is an American psychiatrist and bioethicist who is the Katharine Dexter McCormick and Stanley McCormick Memorial Professor and chair of the department of psychiatry and behavioral sciences at Stanford University School of Medicine. She is the editor-in-chief of Academic Medicine.

== Life ==
Roberts earned a B.A. (1982) in social studies of science and medicine and M.A. (1983) in philosophy from the University of Chicago. She completed a M.D. (1988) and a fellowship in clinical medical ethics (1989) at the Pritzker School of Medicine. At the University of New Mexico School of Medicine, she conducted a psychiatric residency in 1993 followed by a fellowship in 1994.

Roberts was a faculty member at the University of New Mexico School of Medicine for nine years. She specialized in ethics research and psychiatry. She was a professor and vice chair of her department. She founded the institute for ethics and was named the Jack and Donna Rust Professor of Biomedical Ethics. In 2003, she joined the Medical College of Wisconsin, working there for seven years. From 2002 to 2019, she was the editor-in-chief of Academic Psychiatry. She was chair of the department of psychiatry and the Charles E. Kubly Professor of Psychiatry and Behavior Medicine. In 2010, Roberts joined Stanford University School of Medicine as the Katharine Dexter McCormick and Stanley McCormick Memorial Professor and chair of the department of psychiatry and behavioral sciences. She is concurrently chief of the psychiatry service at Stanford University Medical Center. She has served as the editor-in-chief of Academic Medicine since 2019.

== Selected works ==
- Roberts, Laura Weiss; Dyer, Allen R. (2004). Concise Guide to Ethics in Mental Health Care. American Psychiatric Pub. ISBN 978-0-88048-944-7.
- Geppert, Cynthia M. A.; Roberts, Laura Weiss, eds. (2008). The Book of Ethics: Expert Guidance For Professionals Who Treat Addiction. Hazelden Publishing. ISBN 978-1-59285-492-9.
- Chiles, John A.; Strosahl, Kirk D.; Roberts, Laura Weiss (2018). Clinical Manual for Assessment and Treatment of Suicidal Patients, Second Edition. American Psychiatric Pub. ISBN 978-1-61537-137-2.
- Roberts, Laura Weiss; Termuehlen, Gabriel (2021). Professionalism and Ethics, Second Edition: Q & A Self-Study Guide for Mental Health Professionals. American Psychiatric Pub. ISBN 978-1-61537-335-2.
- Carlsson, Katrina; Strosahl, Kirk D.; Roberts, Laura Weiss (2023). Crisis Integration With Acceptance and Commitment Therapy: Theory and Practice. American Psychiatric Pub. ISBN 978-1-61537-325-3.
