= Armored train Hurban =

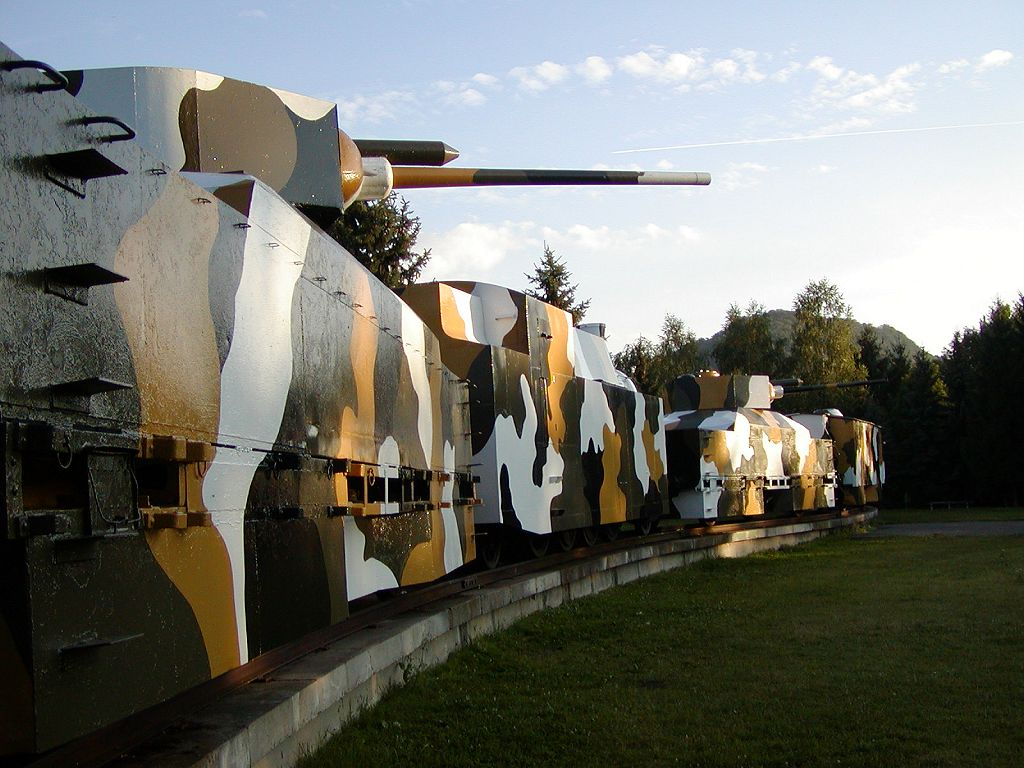
- A replica of the armored train Hurban now located near Zvolen Castle in Zvolen, Slovakia at 48°34′21.3″N 19°07′31″E.
- Type: Armoured train
- Place of origin: Slovakia

Service history
- In service: October 23–24, 1944-Retired thereafter.
- Used by: Slovakia
- Wars: Slovak National Uprising, World War II

Production history
- Produced: September 25, 1944

Specifications
- Crew: 71
- Main armament: 8cm vz.17 field gun located in a cannon carriage 4 37 mm guns located in tank turrets in tank carriages 11 heavy machine guns of 7.92 caliber

The armored train Hurban was an armoured train used during World War II, during the Slovak National Uprising. The Hurban was constructed on September 25, 1944, in the Railway Manufactory in Zvolen, Slovakia, and was the last armored train used in the Slovak National Uprising. A replica is displayed as a monument in a park next to the castle in Zvolen, and an original preserved machine gun carriage is at the Museum of the Slovak National Uprising in Banská Bystrica.

== Combat history ==
The commander of the train was Captain J. Kukliš, and his assistant was Lt. J. Belko, together commanding a crew of 71 men. Hurban operated in the Brezno – Červená Skala area against the 18th division SS Horst Wessel and from October 23–24, 1944, was the main factor in the fight for the upper flow of the Hron river. Despite suffering a damaged engine, it repulsed all German attacks. It was pulled to Harmanec, where it was abandoned in a railway tunnel, the crew fighting on as a partisan detachment.

== See also ==
- Armored train Štefánik
- Krajina Express
