= Armoured train =

Military railway train

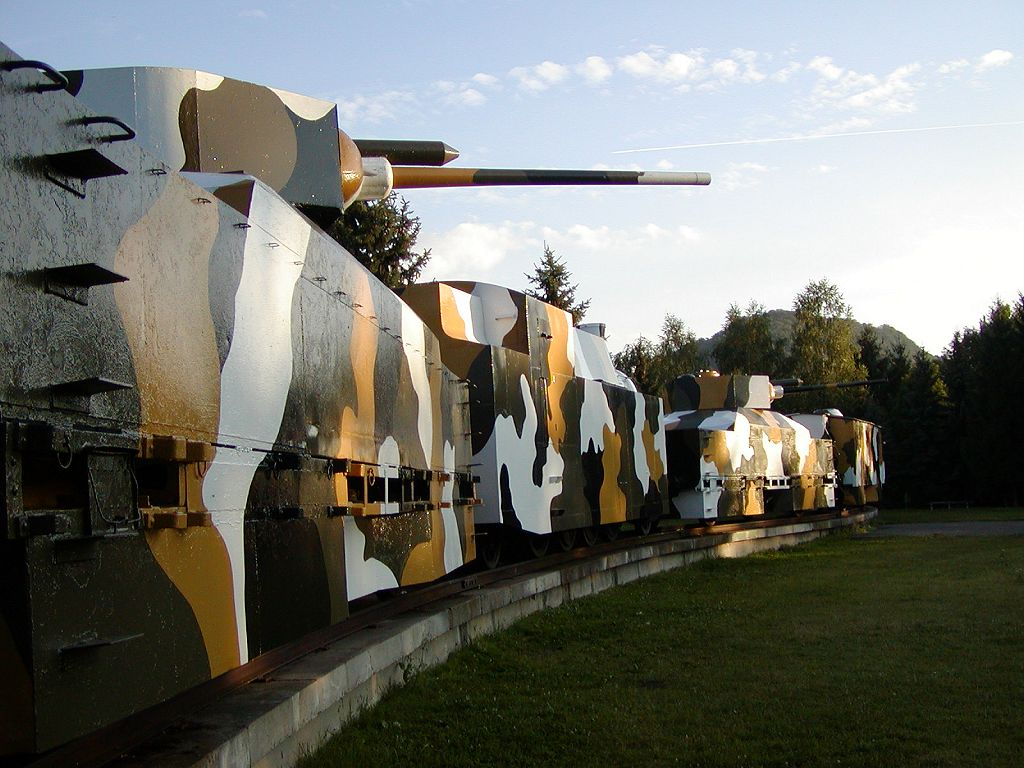
The Hurban armoured train located in Zvolen, Slovakia. It is not the original, but a replica used in a film. Only two preserved original cars from the other train exist; they are exhibited in the Museum of the Slovak National Uprising in Banská Bystrica.

An armoured train (Commonwealth English) or armored train (American English) is a railway train protected with heavy metal plating and which often includes railway wagons armed with artillery, machine guns, and autocannons. Some have also had ports used to fire small arms from the inside of the train, especially in earlier armoured trains. For the most part, they were used during the late 19th and the early 20th centuries, when they offered an innovative way to quickly move large amounts of firepower into a new location.

Most countries have discontinued their use since road vehicles became much more powerful and offered more flexibility, train tracks proved too vulnerable to sabotage and attacks from the air, and air transportation was an even more flexible way to relocate firepower to a new location. However, there have been occasional uses in the late 20th century and early 21st century. Russia has used improvised armoured trains during the Second Chechen War (1999–2009) and in its invasion of Ukraine (2022–present).

Armoured trains were historically fighting systems, equipped with heavy weapons such as artillery. An exception was the US "White Train", the Department of Energy Nuclear Weapons Transport Train, armoured and escorted by personnel armed with personal weapons.

== Definition ==
An armoured train is characterized by the armour from which it takes its name.

It is not to be confused with railway artillery, which includes a large-caliber gun and its crew, but without special protection from them. Trains simply equipped with light weapons without elaborate protective devices, e. g. a simple wagon with a few machine guns sheltered behind sandbags, are also not considered to be armoured trains.

== Design and equipment ==
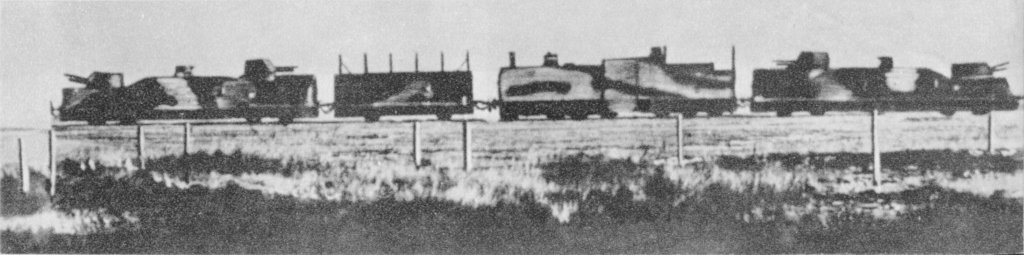
A Polish armoured train, the Danuta, in 1939. From the left: artillery wagon, infantry assault wagon, armoured locomotive, artillery wagon

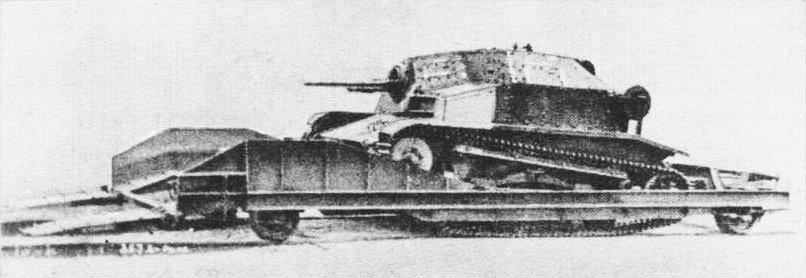
A TKS tankette used as an armoured reconnaissance draisine, an attempt to overcome one of the inflexibilities of the armoured train – being limited to the track

The rail cars on an armoured train were designed for many tasks. Typical roles included:

- Artillery – equipped to carry artillery pieces, along with a mixture of other support weapons such as machine guns and rocket launchers. See also railway guns.
- Infantry – designed to carry infantry units, may also mount machine guns.
- Machine gun – equipped with machine guns.
- Anti-aircraft – equipped with anti-aircraft weapons.
- Command – similar to infantry wagons, but designed to be a train command centre
- Anti-tank – equipped with anti-tank guns, usually in a tank gun turret
- Platform – unarmoured, used for any purpose from the transport of ammunition or vehicles, through track repair or derailing protection, to railroad ploughs for track destruction.
- Troop sleepers
- The German Wehrmacht would sometimes use a flatbed car to carry a Fremdgerät light tank, such as a captured French Somua S-35 or Czech PzKpfw 38(t), or a Panzer II, which could quickly drive down a ramp and pursue enemy partisans away from the railway line
- Missile transport – the USSR had railway-based RT-23 Molodets ICBMs by the late 1980s (to reduce the chances of a first strike succeeding in destroying the launchers for a retaliatory strike). The US at one time proposed having a railway-based system for the MX Missile program, but this never got past the planning stage. The US also used an armoured Department of Energy Nuclear Weapons Transport Train, not for fighting but for transport within the country.

Different types of armour were used to protect from attack by tanks. In addition to various metal plates, concrete and sandbags were used in some cases for improvised armoured trains.

Armoured trains were sometimes escorted by a kind of rail-tank called a draisine. One such example was the 'Littorina' armoured trolley which had a cab in the front and rear, each with a control set so it could be driven down the tracks in either direction. Littorina mounted two dual 7.92 mm MG13 machine gun turrets from Panzer I light tanks.

== History ==
=== Origins ===
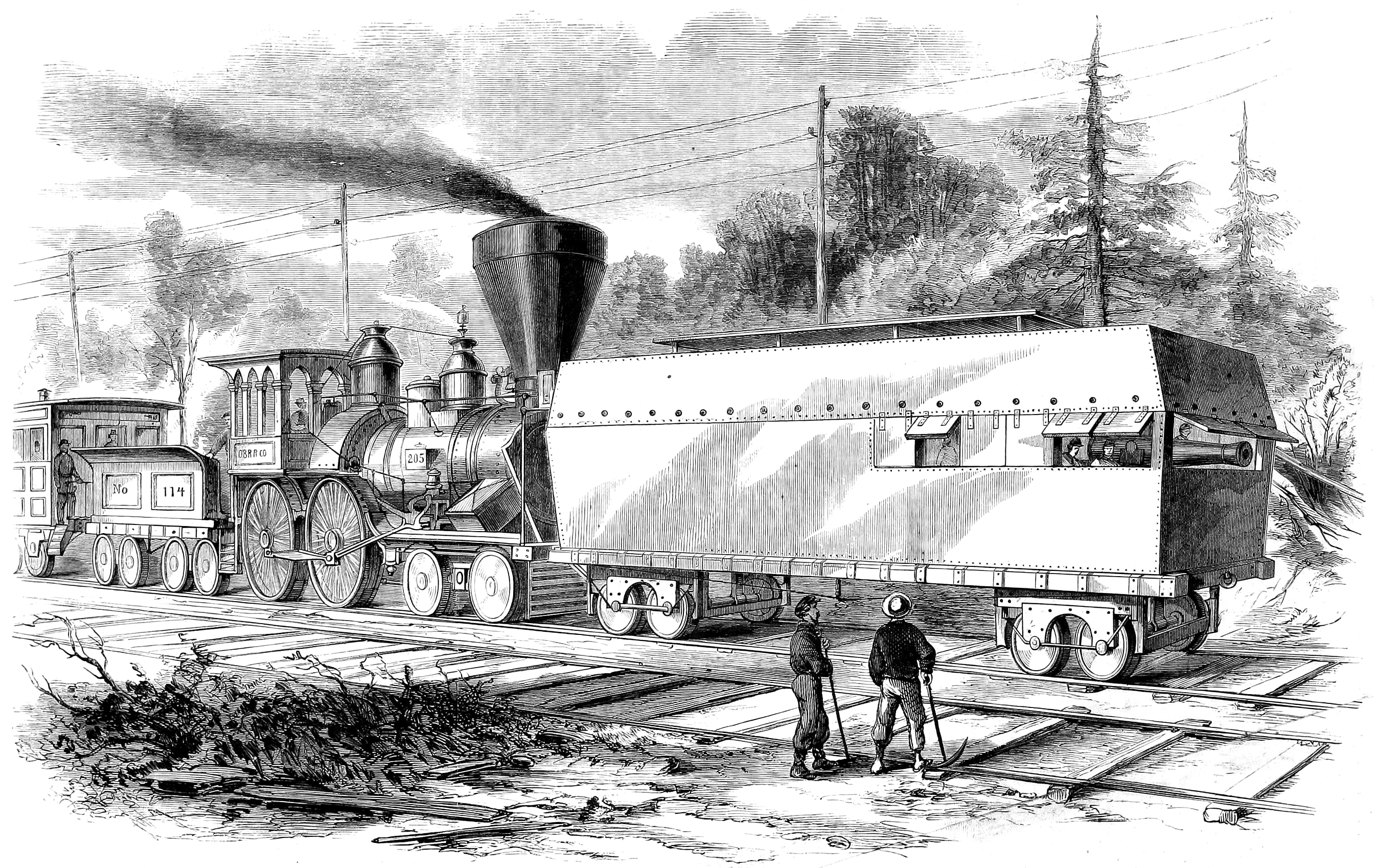
An 1861 "Railroad battery" used to protect workers during the American Civil War

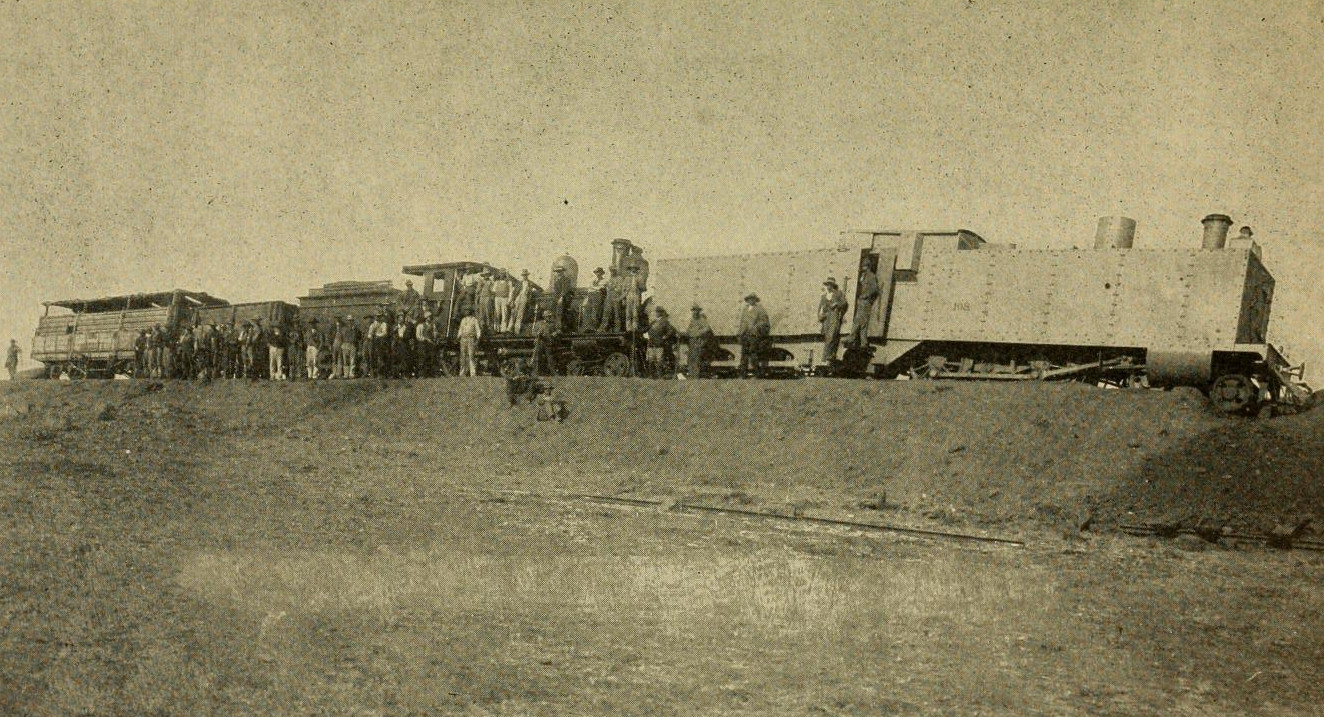
An armoured CGR 3rd Class 4-4-0 1889 locomotive derailed on 12 October 1899 during the first engagement of the Second Boer War at Kraaipan

Armoured and armed trains saw use during the 19th century in the American Civil War (1861–1865), the Franco-Prussian War (1870–1871), the First and Second Boer Wars (1880–1881 and 1899–1902). During the Second Boer War Winston Churchill, then a war correspondent, was travelling on an armoured train which was ambushed by a Boer commando led by General Louis Botha on 15 November 1899; the Boers captured Churchill and many of the train's contingent.

Early in the 20th century, Russia used armoured trains during the Russo-Japanese War. Armoured trains were also used during the Mexican Revolution (1910–1920) and World War I (1914–1918). The most intensive use of armoured trains was during the Russian Civil War (1918–1920). During the Chinese Civil War, White Russian emigrants in the service of Marshal Zhang Zuchang built 14 armored trains in 1924–1928. Some of them, for example "Peking" ("Beijing") were built on the model of the First World War of the type "Zaamurets" (later the Czech "Orlik"). The Spanish Civil War saw a little use of armoured trains, though World War II (1939–1945) saw more. The French used them during the First Indochina War (1946–1954), a number of countries had armoured trains during the Cold War, and they were used during the Yugoslav wars of the 1990s and the 2022 Russian invasion of Ukraine.

=== American Civil War ===
The most successful armed train was a single armoured wagon built to defend the Philadelphia, Wilmington and Baltimore Railroad. The railroad had been attacked by southern forces to prevent transport of Union soldiers to the front, and snipers were discouraging men attempting to repair the damage. Baldwin Locomotive Works modified a baggage wagon in late April 1861. A 24-pounder howitzer was placed on a swivel mount at the opposite end of the wagon from the pushing locomotive. The sides of the wagon were sheathed with 2.5-inch (6.4 cm) oak planks covered with 0.5-inch (1.3 cm) boiler plate. The end of the wagon around the howitzer was fitted with hinged 2-foot (61 cm) panels which could be temporarily lifted to aim and fire the howitzer and then lowered to protect the crew of six men loading the howitzer with canister shot or grapeshot. The remainder of the wagon contained fifty ports for riflemen. The wagon was effective for its original purpose, but vulnerability to artillery rendered such wagons of comparatively little use during later stages of the war. In August 1864, a Confederate raiding party disabled a Baltimore and Ohio Railroad locomotive pushing an armoured wagon, and then piled ties around the armoured wagon and set them afire.

=== Volunteers ===
In 1884 Charles Gervaise Boxall (1852–1914), a Brighton-born solicitor and officer in the 1st Sussex Artillery Volunteers, published The Armoured Train for Coast Defence in Great Britain, outlining a new way to employ heavy artillery. In 1894, when he had become commanding officer of the 1st Sussex AV, railway workers among the volunteers of No 6 Garrison Company manned an armoured train constructed in the workshops of the London, Brighton and South Coast Railway (of which the unit's Honorary Colonel, Sir Julian Goldsmid, was a director).

=== Second Boer War ===
The British Army employed armoured trains during the Second Boer War, most famously a train that was extemporised in the railway workshops at Ladysmith just before the siege was closed round the town. On 15 November 1899 it left the town on reconnaissance manned by a company of the Royal Dublin Fusiliers under the command of Captain Aylmer Haldane, a company of volunteers of the Durban Light Infantry, and a 7-pounder mountain gun manned by sailors from HMS Tartar. Winston Churchill accompanied the mission as a war correspondent. The train was ambushed and part-derailed, and Haldane, Churchill and some 70 of the troops were captured after a fire-fight, although the locomotive got away with the wounded. Recalling his experience in My Early Life, Churchill wrote "Nothing looks more formidable and impressive than an armoured train; but nothing is in fact more vulnerable and helpless. It was only necessary to blow up a bridge of culvert to leave the monster stranded, far from home and help, at the mercy of the enemy".

=== World War I ===
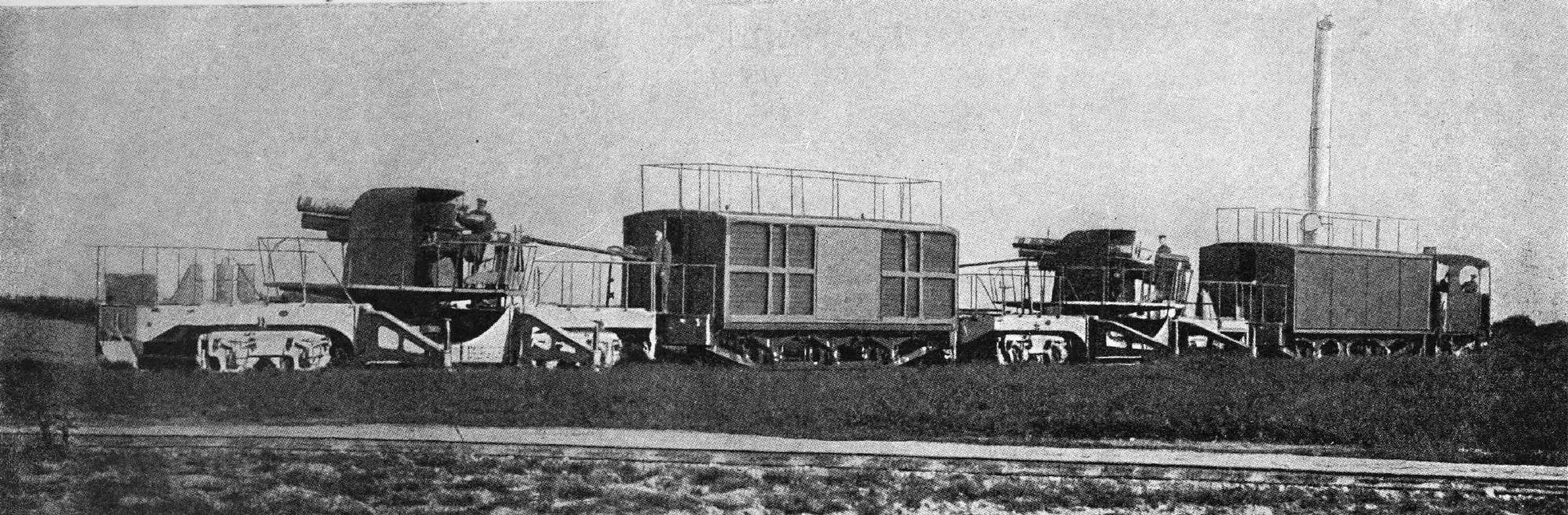
French mobile artillery battery (1914)

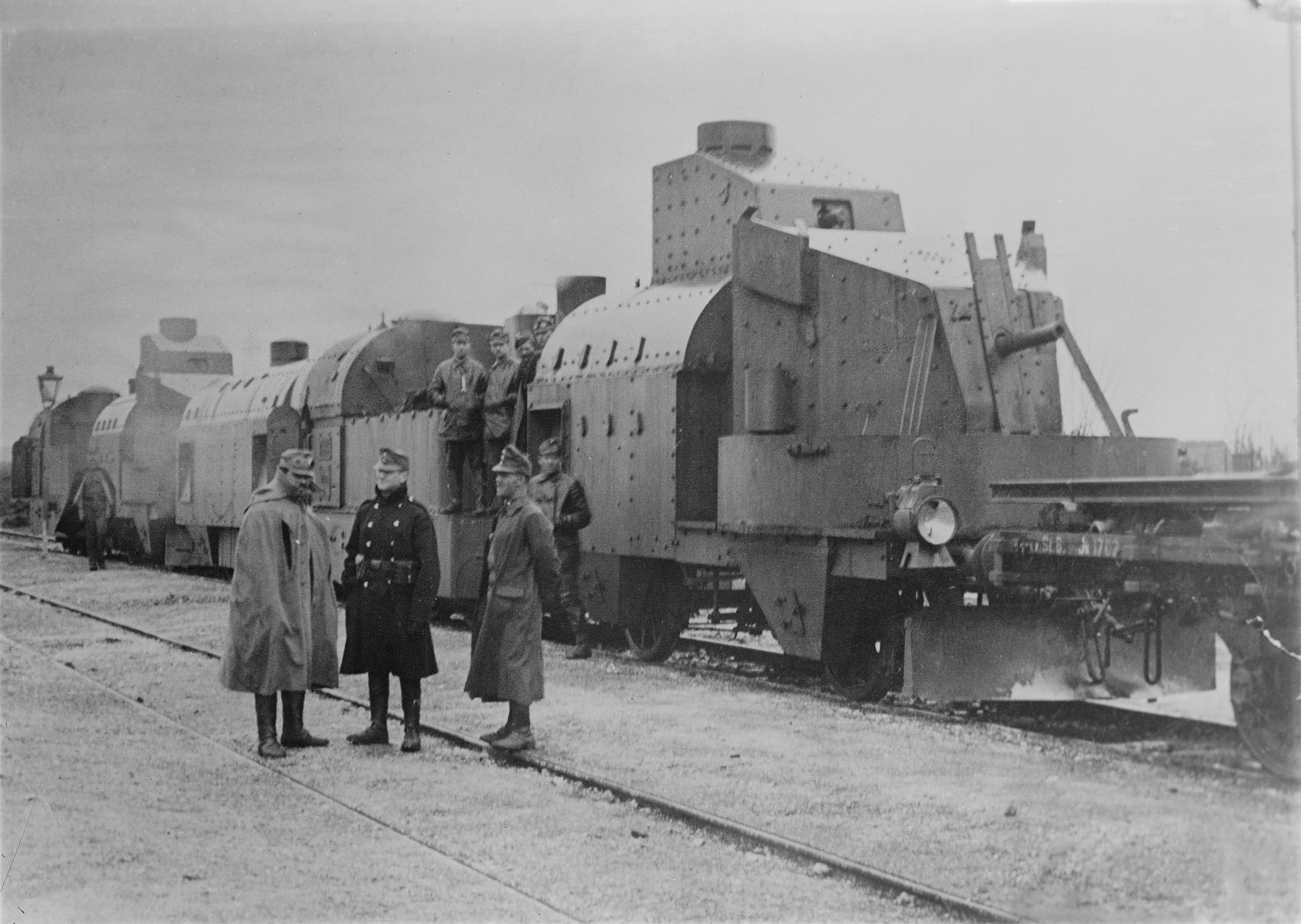
Hungarian MÁVAG armoured train in 1914

During World War I Russia used a mix of light and heavy armoured trains. The heavy trains mounted 4.2 inch or 6 inch guns; the light trains were equipped with 7.62 mm guns.

Austria-Hungary also fielded armoured trains against the Italians in World War I.

A Royal Navy armoured train from Britain, armed with four QF 6 inch naval guns and one QF 4 inch naval gun, was used in support of the British Expeditionary Force in the opening phase of the First Battle of Ypres in October 1914.

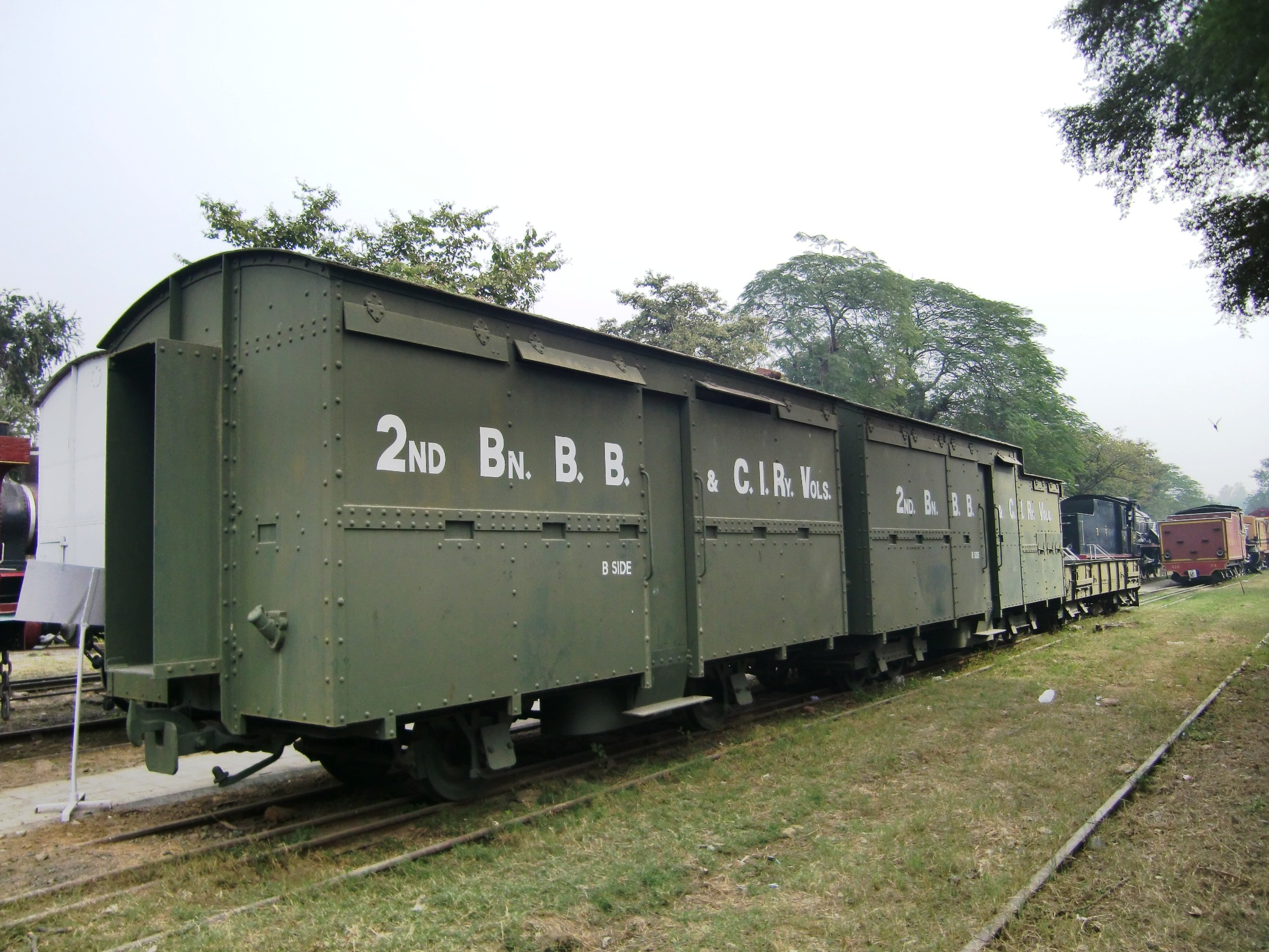
An Auxiliary Force (India) armoured train at National Rail Museum, New Delhi

Two armoured trains were constructed at Crewe Works during 1915 for British coastal defense duties; one was based in Norfolk and one in Edinburgh to patrol rail routes on stretches of coast considered vulnerable to amphibious assault. The trains comprised two gun trucks, one at each end, mounted with a 12-pounder quick firing gun and a machine gun; an armoured cabin behind the artillery piece contained the magazine. Inboard of each gun truck was a truck for infantry quarters. This was also armoured, with observation ports and loops for rifle fire. The armoured locomotive, with the cab and motion protected, was marshalled into the centre of the train. The driver took up a position at whichever end of the train was leading, with the regulator controlled by a mechanical connection. The intention was that the infantry, with artillery support from the train's guns, was to hold off a hostile landing force until reinforcements could be deployed.

Italy fitted twelve armed trains (under the control of the Regia Marina) to protect its Adriatic coast from raids on part of the k.u.k Kriegsmarine; each train was supplemented by a support one. Each armed train was formed by a FS Class 290 locomotive, three to five gun cars, two to four ammo cars and a command car; there were three types of armed train, one with 152 mm guns, another with 120 mm guns and the last with 76 mm AA guns. These trains were considered overall a success, and blunted attempted Austro-Hungarian raids on the Italian coast.

Two armoured trains were produced in the railway workshop located at Ajmer, India. One sent to Mesopotamia (now Iraq) by sea route for the Mesopotamian Campaign. Each train consists six wagons, Two wagons of each trains were ceiling less, each train consists of 12-pounder guns, two Maxim heavy machine guns, two mine-exploding wagons, search light truck and a dynamo telegraph accommodation truck.

=== Interwar years ===
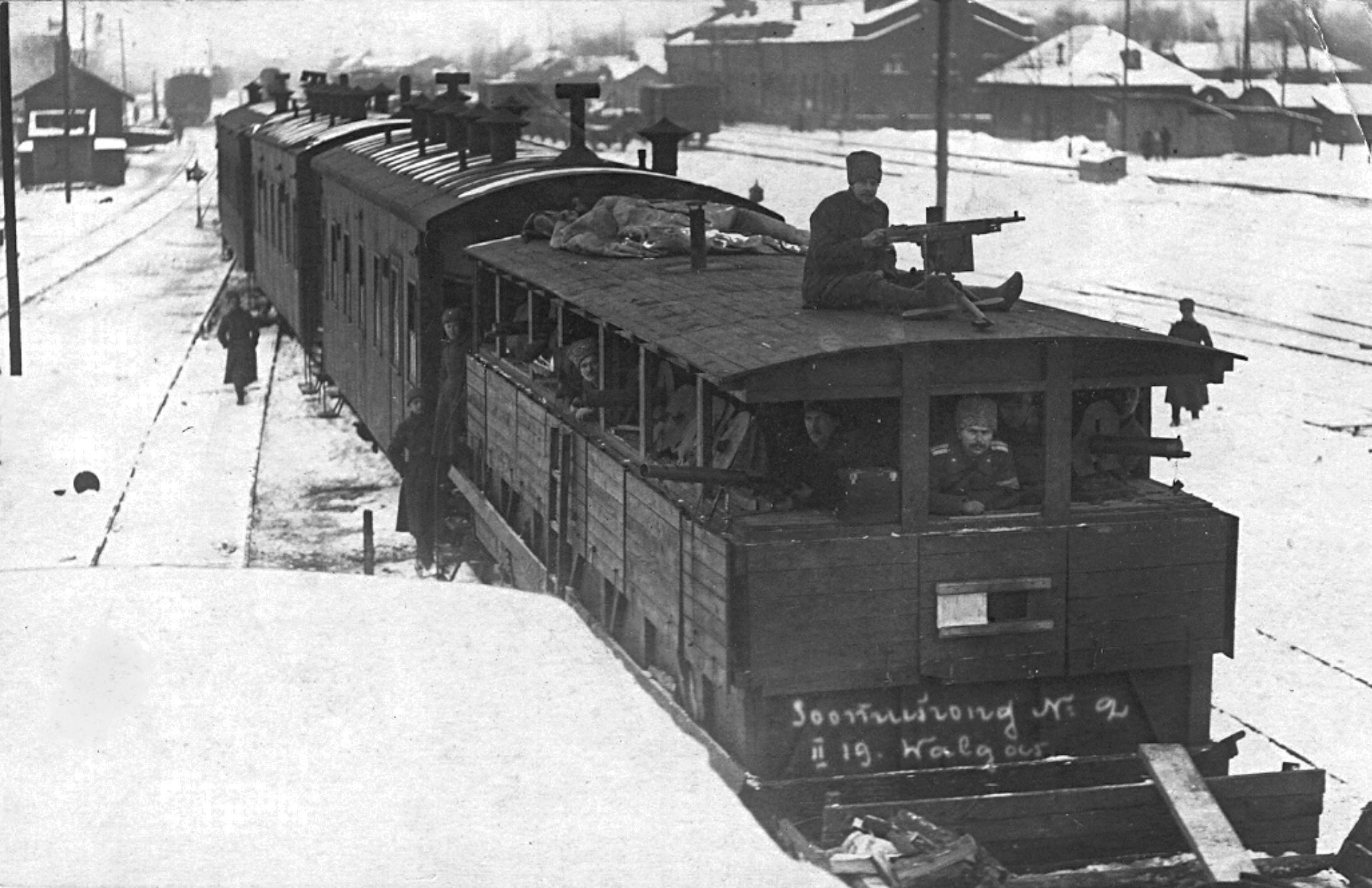
Estonian improvised armoured train in 1919 during the Estonian War of Independence.

The Bolshevik forces in the Russian Civil War used a wide range of armoured trains, including Trotsky's one. Many were improvised by locals, others were constructed by naval engineers at the Putilov and Izhorskiy factories. As a result, the trains ranged from little more than sandbagged flatbeds to the heavily armed and armoured trains produced by the naval engineers. An attempt to standardise the design from October 1919 only had limited success. By the end of the war the Bolshevik forces had 103 armoured trains of all types.

The Czechoslovak Legion used heavily armed and armoured trains to control large lengths of the Trans-Siberian Railway (and of Russia itself) during the Russian Civil War at the end of World War I.

Estonia built a total of 13 armoured trains during the Estonian War of Independence: six on broad-gauge and seven on narrow-gauge railways. The first three armoured trains with fully volunteer crews formed the backbone of the front in critical early stages of conflict. Carriages were former goods carriages and at first armor was limited to wood and sand, but later steel plating, machine guns, and cannons were added. Estonia later created a regiment for its armoured trains in 1934, called the Armoured Train Regiment, which consisted of 3 armoured trains. The regiment was dissolved in 1940, after the USSR invaded the Baltic States, and its railway artillery cannons were transferred to the Soviet army.

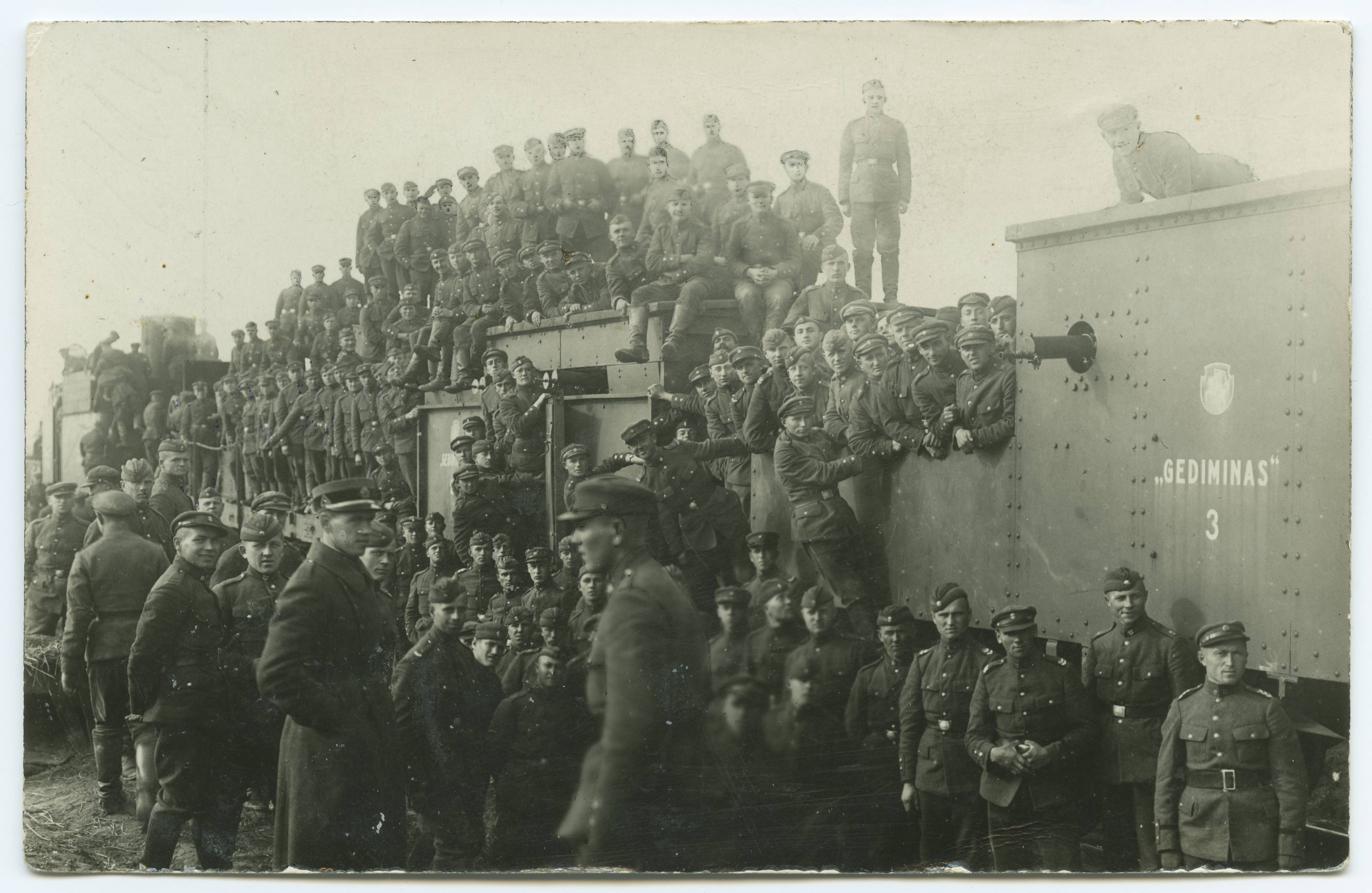
Lithuanian armoured train Gediminas 3 with Lithuanian soldiers

Lithuania had three armoured trains, named after the Grand Dukes of Lithuania: Gediminas, Kęstutis and Algirdas. The armoured trains were used from 1920 to 1935. The first of them, Gediminas, was used in the Polish–Lithuanian War.

After the First World War the use of armoured trains declined. They were used in China in the twenties and early thirties during the Chinese Civil War, most notably by the warlord Zhang Zongchang, who employed refugee Russians to man them.

Six armored trains were built by Paulista forces during the Constitutionalist Revolution.They were designed by French immigrant M.Clément de Baujane and built in the railway workshops with orientations from the polytechnic school.

=== World War II ===
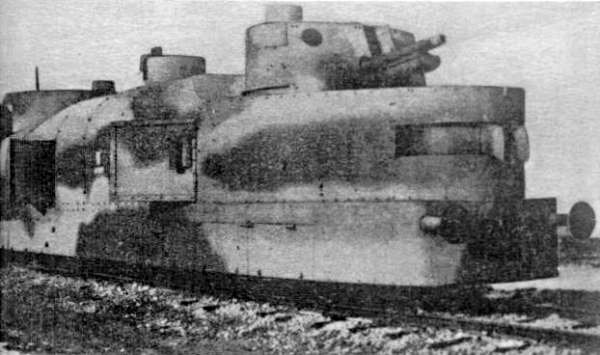
A typical Polish artillery car from 1939. Such cars were used in the trains Śmiały and Piłsudczyk

Poland used armoured trains extensively during the invasion of Poland. One observer noted that "Poland had only few armoured trains, but their officers and soldiers were fighting well. Again and again they were emerging from a cover in thick forests, disturbing German lines".

This prompted Nazi Germany to reintroduce armoured trains into its own armies. Germany then used them to a small degree during World War II. They introduced significant designs of a versatile and well-equipped nature, including railcars which housed anti-aircraft gun turrets, or designed to load and unload tanks and railcars which had complete armour protection with a large concealed gun/howitzer. Germany also had fully armoured locomotives which were used on such trains. In July 1944 the German garrison of Lublin attempted to break out to the west, using an armoured train and an infantry battalion to cover the break. But Soviet tanks bought the train under close and heavy fire, blowing it to pieces and killing scores of escaping German soldiers. The commandant of Lublin was taken prisoner.

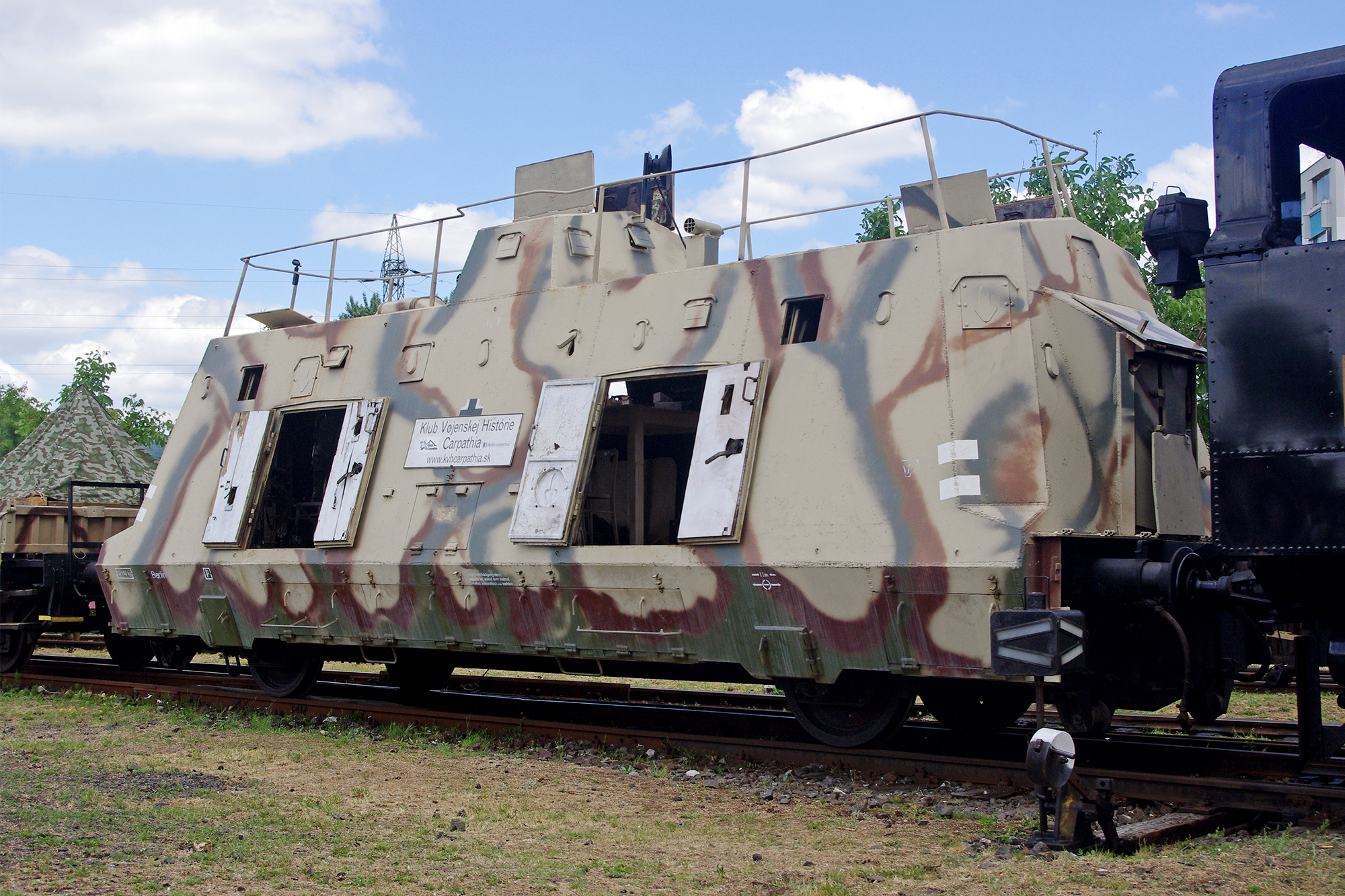
Preserved command car of German World War II era armoured train BP-44 from the railway museum in Bratislava

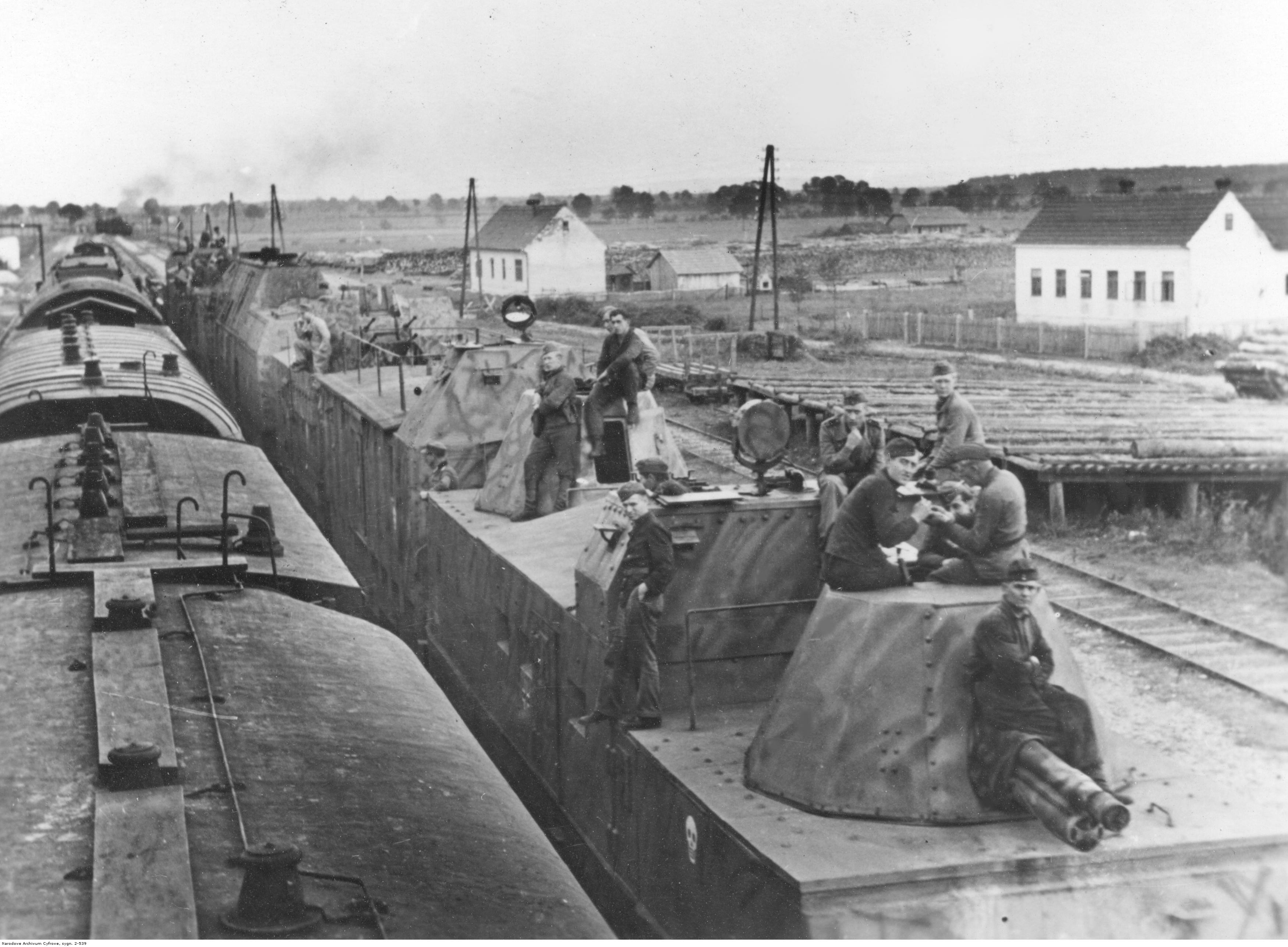
A German BP42 armoured train in the Balkans, 1943.

During the Slovak National Uprising, the Slovak resistance used three armoured trains. They were named Hurban, Štefánik and Masaryk. They were built in the Zvolen railway factory in very short time – Štefánik was built just in 14 days, Hurban in 11 days. Boiler plates were used as the armour. In case of tank cars, whole tanks were used – LT-35 tanks were placed at the platform wagon and armoured construction was built around the hull. Trains saw combat near Stará Kremnička, Čremošné, around Brezno. Later they were abandoned near Harmanec. Some of train cars were later used by Germans for training and for patrolling. Two original cars from the Štefánik train are preserved – the tank car (with original LT-35 tank inside) and machine gun car, and they are exhibited in the Museum of Slovak National Uprising in Banská Bystrica. Another train is exhibited in Zvolen – it is a replica of armoured train Hurban, which was built for the movie Deň, ktorý neumrie. This replica differs in comparison with the original trains by having bigger turrets from the T-34-85 tank, instead of turrets from LT-35.

Britain formed twelve armoured trains in 1940 as part of the preparations to face a German invasion; these were initially armed with QF 6 pounder 6 cwt Hotchkiss guns and six Bren Guns. They were operated by Royal Engineer crews and manned by Royal Armoured Corps troops. In late 1940 preparations began to hand the trains over to the Polish Army in the West, who operated them until 1942. They continued in use in Scotland and were operated by the Home Guard until the last one was withdrawn in November 1944. A 6-pounder wagon from one of these trains is preserved at the Tank Museum. A miniature armoured train ran on the 15-inch gauge Romney Hythe and Dymchurch Railway.

Canada used an armoured train to patrol the Canadian National Railway along the Skeena River from Prince Rupert, British Columbia to the Pacific coast, against a possible Japanese seaborne raid. The train was equipped with a 75 mm gun, two Bofors 40 mm guns, and could accommodate a full infantry company. The No 1 Armoured Train entered service in June 1942, was put into reserve in September 1943, and dismantled the following year.

In 1940 Italy had twelve armed trains ready for use (again under Regia Marina control), nine for anti-ship duties and three for AA duties; six were assigned to La Spezia, and the other six to Taranto. One of them was heavily involved in the Battle of the Alps, shelling French forts in support of an Italian attack towards Menton, and suffering heavy damage by return fire. By 1943, eight trains had been deployed to Sicily; Allied air superiority did not allow them to have any meaningful role, and eventually they were all abandoned and destroyed by their crews.

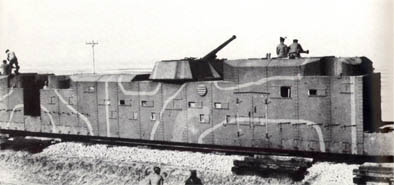
Imperial Japanese Army Type 94 armoured train, showing artillery wagon 'KO'

The Imperial Japanese Army also utilized armoured trains. In the 1920s, they utilized converted passenger trains to guard the rail lines in Manchuria. In the 1930s they produced specific armoured trains, which were used in Manchuria and when they engaged Chinese NRA and CPC troops in Second Sino-Japanese War (1937–1945).

The Soviet Red Army had a large number of armoured trains at the start of World War II but many were lost in 1941. Trains built later in the war tended to be fitted with T-34 or KV series tank turrets. Others were fitted as specialist anti-aircraft batteries. A few were fitted as heavy artillery batteries often using guns taken from ships.

=== Post-World War II ===
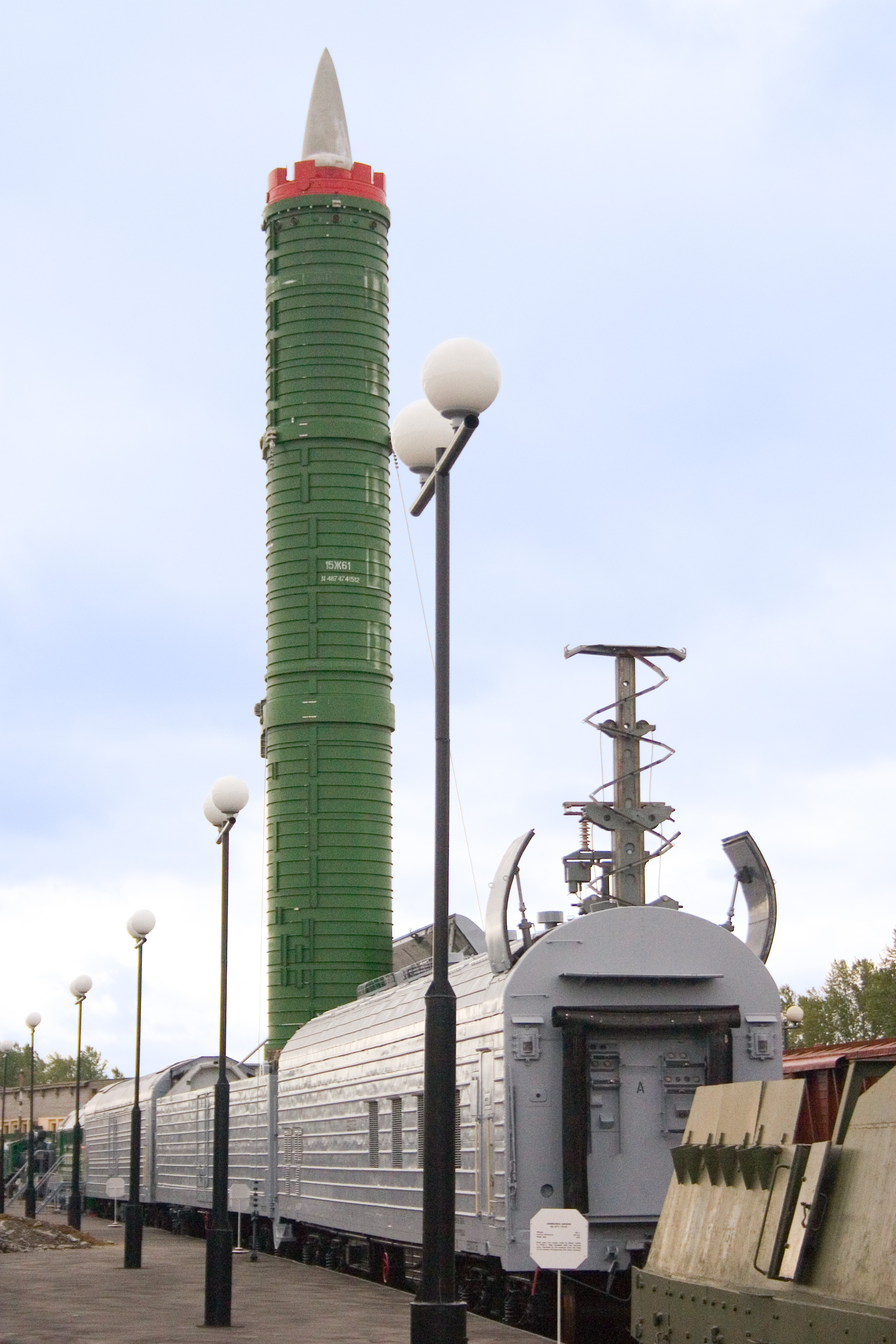
A RT-23 Molodets in the Saint Petersburg railway museum

In the First Indochina War, the French Union used the armoured and armed train La Rafale as both a cargo-carrier and a mobile surveillance unit. In February 1951 the first Rafale was in service on the Saigon-Nha Trang line, Vietnam while from 1947 to May 1952 the second one which was escorted by onboard Cambodian troops of the BSPP (Brigade de Surveillance de Phnom Penh) was used on the Phnom Penh-Battambang line, Cambodia. In 1953 both trains were attacked by the Viet-Minh guerrillas who destroyed or mined stone bridges when passing by.

Fulgencio Batista's army operated an armoured train during the Cuban Revolution; it was derailed and destroyed during the Battle of Santa Clara, and is commemorated by the Tren Blindado (armoured train) memorial.

An improvised armoured train named the "Krajina express" (Krajina ekspres) was used during the Croatian War of Independence of the early 1990s by the army of the Republic of Serbian Krajina. Composed of three fighting cars and three freight cars hooked to the front to protect it from mine blasts, the train carried a M18 Hellcat with a 76 mm cannon, a 40 mm Bofors, a 20 mm cannon, twin 57 mm rocket launchers and a 120 mm mortar, plus several machine guns of between 12.7 and 7.62 mm. During the Siege of Bihać in 1994, it was attacked on a few occasions with antitank rocket-propelled grenades and 76 mm guns and hit by a 9K11 Malyutka missile, but the damage was minor, as most of the train was covered with thick sheets of rubber which caused the missile's warhead to explode too early to do any real damage. The train was eventually destroyed by its own crew lest it fall into enemy hands during Operation Storm, Croatia's successful effort to reclaim the territories under occupation by Serbs. The Army of Republika Srpska operated a similar train that was ambushed and destroyed in October 1992 at the entrance to the town of Gradačac by Bosnian Muslim forces that included a T-55 tank. The wreckage was later converted into a museum. The Croatian Army deployed a two-wagon armoured train built in Split with a shield composed of two plates, one 8 mm and the other 6 mm thick, with a 30–50 mm gap filled with sand between them. The vehicle was armed with 12.7 mm machine guns.

One armoured train that remains in regular use is that of Kim Il Sung and Kim Jong Il, which the former received as a gift from the Soviet Union and the latter used heavily for state visits to China and Russia as he distrusted the North Korean fleet of aging Russian aircraft.

==== Soviet Union ====
Facing the threat of Chinese cross-border raids during the Sino-Soviet split, the USSR developed armoured trains in the early 1970s to protect the Trans-Siberian Railway. According to different accounts, four or five trains were built. Every train included ten main battle tanks, two light amphibious tanks, several AA guns, as well as several armoured personnel carriers, supply vehicles and equipment for railway repairs. They were all mounted on open platforms or in special rail cars. Different parts of the train were protected with 5–20 mm thick armour. These trains were used by the Soviet Army to intimidate nationalist paramilitary units in 1990 during the early stages of the First Nagorno-Karabakh War.

Towards the end of the Cold War, both superpowers began to develop railway-based ICBMs mounted on armoured trains; the Soviets deployed the SS-24 missile in 1987, but budget costs and the changing international situation led to the cancellation of the programme, with all remaining railway-based missiles finally being deactivated in 2005.

==== Russia ====
Regular armoured trains have continued to be used by the post-Soviet Russian military. Two were deployed during the Second Chechen War, assisting in the Battle of Grozny (1999–2000); one was sent to the 2008 Russo-Georgian War. Outside of the formal Russian military hierarchy, Russian-backed militants in the Donbas region of Ukraine were pictured operating a homemade armoured train in late 2015.

An armoured train made up of two diesel locomotives powering eight various railcars, which carried anti-aircraft weaponry and unknown cargo supported the southern flank of the 2022 Russian invasion of Ukraine. A Russian Railway Troops armoured train named Yenisei used in Ukraine was later reported in more detail; it was made up of two locomotives and eight cars. Ukrainian sources accused Russia of stealing Ukrainian Railways assets to build Yenisei. Russia released video of another armoured train in June 2022. In total, Russia's armoured train fleet consist of four known trains: Yenisei, Baikal, Volga and Amur.

== Armoured tram ==
Armoured trams have also been used, although not purpose-built. The just-formed Red Army used at least one armoured tram during the fighting for Moscow in the October Revolution in 1917. The Slovak National Uprising, better known for its armoured trains described above, also used at least one makeshift example.

== See also ==
- List of armoured trains
- Battle of Mokra
- Railway gun
- Railway troops
