= Armored train Štefánik =

Military train used during World War II in Slovakia

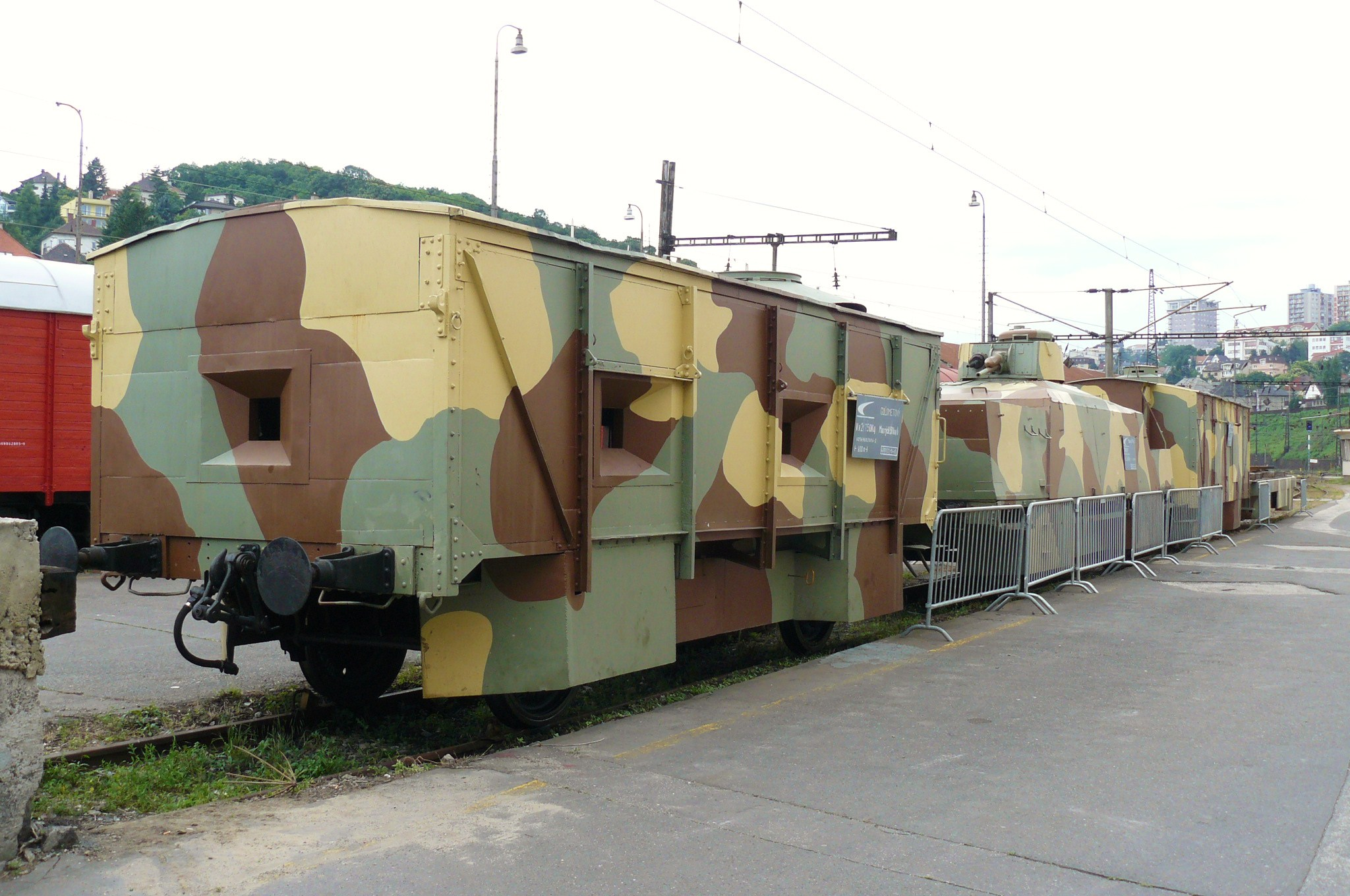
Restored armored train Štefánik

The armored train Štefánik was a military train used during World War II (during the Slovak National Uprising) in Slovakia.

The building of the armored train started on September 4, 1944. It was finished on September 18, 1944, by a railway manufacturer in Zvolen, Slovakia.

It was equipped with:

- a 75mm Czechoslovak mountain cannon vz. 15 in one cannon carriage
- 2 37mm cannons in two tank carriages (LT vz. 35)
- 10 7.92mm machine guns

The commander of the train was Captain F. Adam, and his assistant was Lieutenant A. Tököly. The crew consisted of 70 men. Its first action was on September 27, 1944, at the Hronská Dúbrava – Kremnica line. Near Stará Kremnička, it was fighting against a German army advancing to Zvolen. While the train was moving to Hronská Dúbrava, the German Luftwaffe destroyed its locomotive. After repair, it successfully fought at Žiar nad Hronom, Jalná, and Hronská Dúbrava. On October 18, 1944, the train moved from Hronská Dúbrava to Krupina, where it fought against SS Schill. Two days later, it traveled to Dobrá Niva, where it was attacked several times by the German Luftwaffe. After a German attack on October 25, 1944, it left Zvolen as the last train, traveled to Banská Bystrica, and then moved to Ulmanka, where it was blocked by a retired train. After discarding all weapons, the crew continued fighting as a partisan battalion.

The tank cars were built not only from tank turrets, but whole tanks. A LT vz. 35 tank was placed on a flatbed car, after which armor was added around it.

Preserved wagons from the train are displayed in an outdoor exhibit at the Museum of Slovak National Uprising in Banská Bystrica.

== See also ==
- Armored train Hurban
