= Mary Leonard (pediatrician) =

American pediatric nephrologist and epidemiologist

- Education: Northwestern University; Stanford University; University of Pennsylvania
- Scientific career
- Fields: Pediatric nephrology, epidemiology
- Workplaces: University of Pennsylvania; Stanford University

Mary Beth Leonard is an American pediatric nephrologist and epidemiologist who is the Arline and Pete Harman professor and chair of the department of pediatrics at the Stanford University School of Medicine.

== Life ==
Leonard earned a B.A. in chemistry from Northwestern University in 1984. She completed a M.D. at Stanford University School of Medicine in 1989. At the Children's Hospital of Philadelphia, she completed a pediatric residency in 1992, a pediatric nephrology fellowship in 1995, and a pediatric nutrition research fellowship in 1997. She received a M.S. in clinical epidemiology from the University of Pennsylvania in 1998.

From 1997 to 2006, Leonard was an assistant professor of pediatrics at the Perelman School of Medicine at the University of Pennsylvania. She was promoted to associate professor with tenure in 2006 and professor in 2012. Leonard researches the impact of chronic diseases on bone metabolism, nutrition, and physical function. In 2014, she joined Stanford University School of Medicine as a profess or pediatrics. From 2015 to 2016, she was the associate dean of maternal and child health research. On July 1, 2016, she was promoted to the Arline and Pete Harman Professor and chair of the department of pediatrics and she became the Adalyn Jay physician-in-chief at the Lucile Packard Children's Hospital. She succeeded Hugh O'Brodovich.
