= Stanford University School of Medicine =

Private medical school in Stanford, California, US

- Type: Private medical school
- Established: 1908; 118 years ago
- Parent institution: Stanford University
- Dean: Lloyd B. Minor
- Faculty: 801
- Students: 3,498
- Postgraduates: 1,158
- Location: Stanford, California, United States; 37°26′04″N 122°10′34″W
- Campus: Suburban
- Vice Dean: Linda M. Boxer
- Website: med.stanford.edu

The Stanford University School of Medicine is the medical school of Stanford University and is located in Stanford, California, United States. It traces its roots to the Medical Department of the University of the Pacific, founded in San Francisco in 1858. This medical institution, then called Cooper Medical College, was acquired by Stanford in 1908. In 1959, the medical school moved to the Stanford campus near Palo Alto, California.

The School of Medicine, along with Stanford Health Care and Lucile Packard Children's Hospital, is part of Stanford Medicine.

== History ==
In 1855, Illinois physician Elias Samuel Cooper moved to San Francisco in the wake of the California Gold Rush. In cooperation with the University of the Pacific (also known as California Wesleyan College), Cooper established the Medical Department of the University of the Pacific, the first medical school on the West Coast, in 1858, on Mission Street near 3rd Street in San Francisco. However, Cooper died in 1862, and without his leadership, the Medical Department of the University of the Pacific declined.

In 1870, Cooper's nephew, Levi Cooper Lane, reactivated and reorganized the University of the Pacific's medical department. In 1882, Lane donated a new building at the intersection of Webster and Sacramento Streets and established the department as a separate school, the Cooper Medical College. Lane built a hospital and a nursing school and provided for the creation of Lane Medical Library.

In 1908, Cooper Medical College was deeded to Stanford University as a gift. It became Stanford's medical institution, initially called the Stanford Medical Department and later the Stanford University School of Medicine. In the 1950s, the Stanford Board of Trustees decided to move the school to the Stanford main campus near Palo Alto. The move was completed in 1959. The San Francisco medical campus became Presbyterian Hospital and later California Pacific Medical Center.

In the 1980s, the Medical Center underwent a major expansion. A new hospital was added in 1989 with 20 new operating rooms, intensive care and inpatient units, and other technological additions. The Beckman Center for Molecular and Genetic Medicine opened in May 1989 as an interdisciplinary center focusing on the molecular and genetic basis of disease. The Lucile Packard Children's Hospital was completed in 1991, further expanding Stanford Medicine.

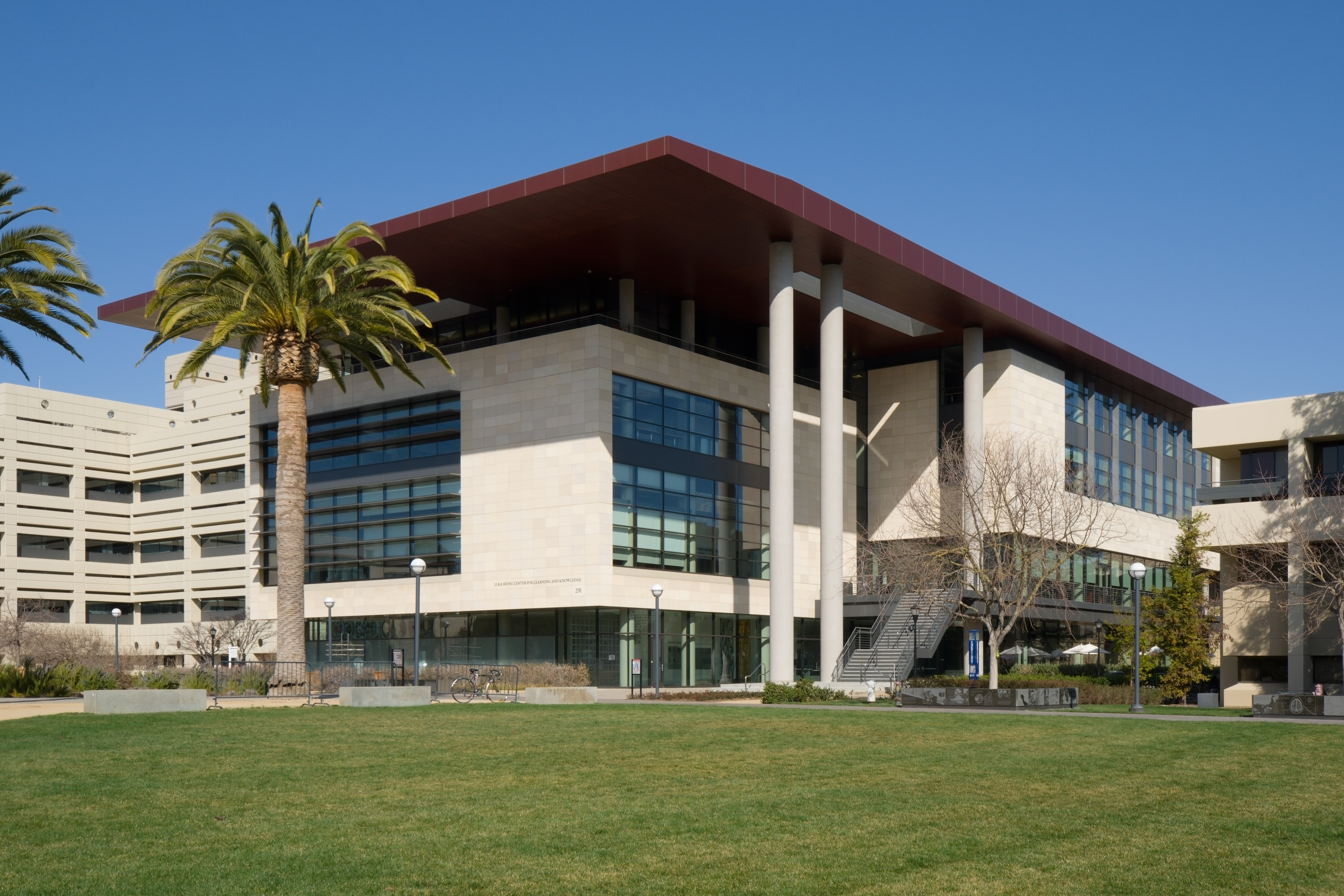
Li Ka Shing Center for Learning and Knowledge

In the early years of the 21st century, the School of Medicine underwent rapid construction to further expand teaching and clinical opportunities. The Li Ka Shing Center for Learning and Knowledge opened in 2010. It serves as the gateway to the School of Medicine and provides a new model of medical education by combining biomedical research with clinical education and information technology. The Lorry I. Lokey Stem Cell Research Building also opened in 2010; it is the largest stem cell and regenerative medicine facility in North America. The Stem Cell Research Building is the first of the planned Stanford Institutes of Medicine and houses offices for faculty from the Stanford Cancer Center and "hotel space" offices for visiting researchers.

== Academic programs and students ==
The School of Medicine has reversed the traditional teaching method, reserving classroom time for problem-solving exercises instead of lectures, which are completed outside of school as homework. With funding from the Robert Wood Johnson Foundation, school leaders are collaborating on the use of the "flipped classroom" approach to content delivery.

The School of Medicine also has a history of educating physician assistants (PAs). Stanford University partnered with Foothill College in 1971 to form the Primary Care Associate Program (PCAP), which has graduated more than 1,500 PAs. The last PCAP class graduated in 2018. Today, the Stanford School of Medicine offers a Master of Science in PA Studies program that trains clinical PAs to practice in any area of medicine and to be leaders in community health, research, and medical education. The program offers a novel approach to curriculum delivery, expanded clinical opportunities, and interprofessional education, with PA students taking courses alongside MD students. The 30-month program accepts 27 students each year and has an acceptance rate of less than 2%.

== Rankings and admissions ==
In the 2021 U.S. News & World Report rankings, Stanford was ranked fourth in the nation among medical schools for research. Admission to the MD program at Stanford is highly competitive: in 2019, 6,894 people applied, 422 were interviewed, and 175 were accepted for 90 spots.

Stanford is one of several schools in the United States to use the multiple mini-interview system, developed at McMaster University Medical School in Canada, to evaluate candidates.

Along with the School of Humanities and Science, the Stanford School of Medicine also runs the Biosciences PhD Program, which was ranked first in 2019 among graduate programs in the biological sciences by U.S. News & World Report. According to U.S. News for 2019, Stanford's graduate school specialties were ranked #1 in genetics, genomics, and bioinformatics, #1 in neuroscience and neurobiology, #1 in cell biology, #3 in biochemistry, biophysics, and structural biology, and #4 in ecology and evolutionary biology.

== Faculty ==
The School of Medicine has 1,948 full-time faculty. Over the past six decades, eight faculty members have won Nobel Prizes, and among its 2019 faculty members are:

- 37 members of the National Academy of Sciences
- 49 members of the National Academy of Medicine
- 4 MacArthur Foundation "geniuses"
- 15 Howard Hughes Medical Institute investigators
- 26 National Institutes of Health Innovator and Young Innovator Awards

== Notable alumni ==
- Lori Alvord – first board-certified female Diné surgeon, author of The Scalpel and the Silver Bear, and 2013 nominee for U.S. Surgeon General
- John C. Baldwin – former dean of Dartmouth Medical School and former president of the Texas Tech University Health Sciences Center
- Cheri Blauwet – professional cyclist, winner of Boston Marathon
- Linda M. Boxer – hematologist, vice dean and Stanley McCormick Memorial Professor
- William Brody – president of the Salk Institute and former president of Johns Hopkins University
- David D. Burns – psychiatrist and author
- Amy Chow – Olympic gold medalist
- Alexander A. Clerk – psychiatrist and sleep medicine specialist
- Toby Freedman – aerospace medical director/sports medicine (Los Angeles Rams and Los Angeles Lakers)
- Bill Frist – cardiothoracic surgery fellow, United States Senator, former presidential candidate
- Randall B. Griepp – cardiothoracic surgeon who collaborated with Norman Shumway in the development of the first successful heart transplant procedures in the U.S.
- Mary Halton – physician, suffragist, and early IUD researcher; graduated in 1900 from Cooper Medical College
- John C. Handy – physician and surgeon in Tucson, Arizona (graduate of Medical College of the Pacific)
- Eric Heiden – Olympic gold medalist and physician
- David A. Karnofsky – medical oncologist known for the Karnofsky score
- Robert Kerlan – founder of Kerlan-Jobe Sports Medicine Orthopaedic Clinic
- Milt McColl – former 49er linebacker and medical family doctor
- Scott Parazynski – NASA astronaut, veteran of five Space Shuttle missions
- Dorian "Doc" Paskowitz (1921–2014) – surfer and physician
- Joshua Prager – pain medicine specialist and neuromodulator
- Mary Elizabeth Bennett Ritter – one of the first women to earn an MD in California, advocate for women's rights and public health in Berkeley
- Anna Elizabeth Rude – director of the Child Hygiene division, U.S. Children's Bureau, 1918–1924
- Val Murray Runge – John Sealy Distinguished Chair and Professor of Radiology University of Texas Medical Branch
- Belding Scribner – professor, University of Washington, inventor of the Scribner shunt
- Leslee Subak – chair of the department of obstetrics and gynecology
- Huey-Kang Sytwu – president, National Health Research Institutes
- Irving Weissman – stem cell biologist, founder of Systemix
- Ray Lyman Wilbur – president of American Medical Association, president of Stanford (1916–1943), personal physician of President Harding
- Owen Witte – distinguished professor and founding director of the UCLA Eli and Edythe Broad Center of Regenerative Medicine and Stem Cell Research at UCLA

== Notable faculty ==
- John R. Adler – Professor of Neurosurgery, inventor of the Cyberknife
- Ben Barres – Professor of Neurobiology, renowned for research on glial biology
- George W. Beadle – Professor of Biology, winner of the 1958 Nobel Prize in Physiology or Medicine
- Paul Berg – biochemist, winner of the 1980 Nobel Prize in Chemistry for discovery of recombinant DNA
- Jay Bhattacharya – 18th Director of the National Institutes of Health, research associate at the National Bureau of Economic Research, and Director of Stanford's Center for Demography and Economics of Health and Aging
- Andra Blomkalns – professor and chair of the department of emergency medicine
- Melissa Bondy – inaugural chair of the department of epidemiology and population health
- Eugene C. Butcher – Professor of Pathology, winner of the 2004 Crafoord Prize
- Howard Y. Chang - Chief Scientific Officer of Amgen; winner of the 2024 Albany Medical Center Prize, 2024 Lurie Prize in Biomedical Sciences, 2024 King Faisal Prize in Biology, 2024 Stanley J. Korsmeyer Award, and 2018 NAS Award in Molecular Biology
- Robert A. Chase – Professor of Surgery, founder of Stanford Plastic & Reconstructive Surgery
- Gilbert Chu – Professor of Biochemistry and Medicine
- Alexander A. Clerk – Clinical Associate Professor of Psychiatry; director of the Stanford Center for Sleep Sciences and Medicine (1990–1998)
- Stanley Norman Cohen – Professor of Genetics and of Medicine, accomplished the first transplantation of genes between cells, winner of the National Medal of Science, winner of the National Medal of Technology, inducted into National Inventors Hall of Fame
- Frances K. Conley – neurosurgeon known for advancing women in American medicine
- Karl Deisseroth – winner of the 2026 Nobel Prize in Physiology or Medicine, Professor of Bioengineering and of Psychiatry and Behavioral Sciences, pioneer of optogenetics, winner of the 2016 Breakthrough Prize in Life Sciences.
- William C. Dement – Professor of Psychiatry and Behavioral Sciences, pioneer in sleep research
- Stanley Falkow – Robert W. and Vivian K. Cahill Professor in Cancer Research, conducted pioneering work in how bacteria can cause human disease and how antibiotic resistance spreads, winner of the National Medal of Science
- Andrew Fire – winner of the 2006 Nobel Prize in Physiology or Medicine
- Thomas J. Fogarty – Clinical Professor of Surgery, member of National Inventors Hall of Fame, owner of more than 100 surgical patents, including the Fogarty balloon catheter
- Ralph S. Greco – Johnson and Johnson Distinguished Professor, Emeritus of Surgery at Stanford University School of Medicine
- Christian Guilleminault – Professor of Psychiatry and Behavioral Sciences, pioneer in sleep research, first to describe obstructive sleep apnea
- Philip Hanawalt – Hertzstein Professor of Biology and Dermatology, discovered transcription coupled repair of DNA
- Griffith R. Harsh – vice chair of the Stanford Department of Neurosurgery and Director of the Stanford Brain Tumor Center, spouse of Meg Whitman
- Leonard Herzenberg – winner of the Kyoto Prize for development of fluorescent-activated cell sorting
- Herbert N. Hultgren – Professor of Medicine (Cardiovascular) Emeritus, high-altitude medicine pioneer and researcher
- Henry S. Kaplan – pioneer in radiation therapy for cancer, inventor of the first linear accelerator in the Western hemisphere
- Jennifer L. Kelsey – expert in epidemiology of musculoskeletal disorders, former Chief of Epidemiology
- Brian Kobilka – Professor of Molecular and Cellular Physiology, winner of the 2012 Nobel Prize in Chemistry
- Silvana Konermann - co-founder and executive director of Arc Institute
- Arthur Kornberg – winner of the 1959 Nobel Prize in Physiology or Medicine (with Severo Ochoa) for discovery of the mechanisms of the biological synthesis of RNA and DNA
- Roger Kornberg – winner of the 2006 Nobel Prize in Chemistry, discoverer of nucleosome and transcriptional mediator, member of National Academy of Sciences
- Sheri Krams – professor of surgery specializing in abdominal transplantation
- William Langston – founder and chief executive officer of the Parkinson's Institute and Clinical Center in Sunnyvale, California
- Donald Laub – founder of ReSurge International
- Quynh-Thu Le – chair of the department of radiation oncology
- Joshua Lederberg – founder of the Stanford department of genetics, co-recipient of 1958 Nobel Prize in Physiology or Medicine
- Mary Leonard – chair of the department of pediatrics
- Michael Levitt – winner of the 2013 Nobel Prize in Chemistry
- Kate Lorig – director of the Stanford Patient Education Research Center
- Alex Macario – Professor of Anesthesiology
- Yvonne Maldonado – COVID-19 researcher
- Daria Mochly-Rosen – George D. Smith Professor for Translational Medicine
- Judith Graham Pool – discovered cryoprecipitate, founded and chaired the Professional Women of Stanford University Medical School, founding member and co-president of the Association for Women in Science
- Stephen Quake – professor and co-chair of Bioengineering, founder of Fluidigm Corp, Helicos Biosciences, inventor of non-invasive prenatal diagnostics by sequencing, winner of Lemelson–MIT Prize; Head of Science at the Chan Zuckerberg Initiative
- Bruce Reitz – performed first combined adult human heart-lung transplant
- Laura Roberts – chair of the department of psychiatry and behavioral sciences
- Robert Sapolsky – neuroscientist and Professor of Neurology, most noted for his studies on stress
- Lucy Shapiro – Professor of Developmental Biology, winner of the National Medal of Science
- Norman Shumway – heart transplant pioneer, performed first heart transplant in the US
- Eila C. Skinner – Chair of Urology
- Konstantina M. Stankovic – Bertarelli Foundation Professor and Chair of Otolaryngology–Head and Neck Surgery
- Marcia Stefanick – professor and PI of the Women's Health Initiative Strong and Healthy Trial (WHISH)
- Lyman Maynard Stowe – former Stanford Associate Dean of Academic Affairs and first dean of the University of Connecticut School of Medicine
- Samuel Strober – former chief of the Division of Immunology and Rheumatology, co-founder of Dendreon
- Lubert Stryer – National Medal of Science recipient, Winzer Professor of Neurobiology, author of biochemistry textbook
- Thomas C. Südhof – winner of the 2013 Nobel Prize in Physiology or Medicine
- Edward Tatum – co-winner of the 1958 Nobel Prize in Physiology or Medicine
- Jared Tinklenberg – Professor of Psychiatry and Behavioral Sciences
- Irving Weissman – leading stem cell biologist, director of the Stanford Institute for Stem Cell Biology and Regenerative Medicine, founder of Systemi
