= Val Murray Runge =

American professor of radiology

Val M. Runge
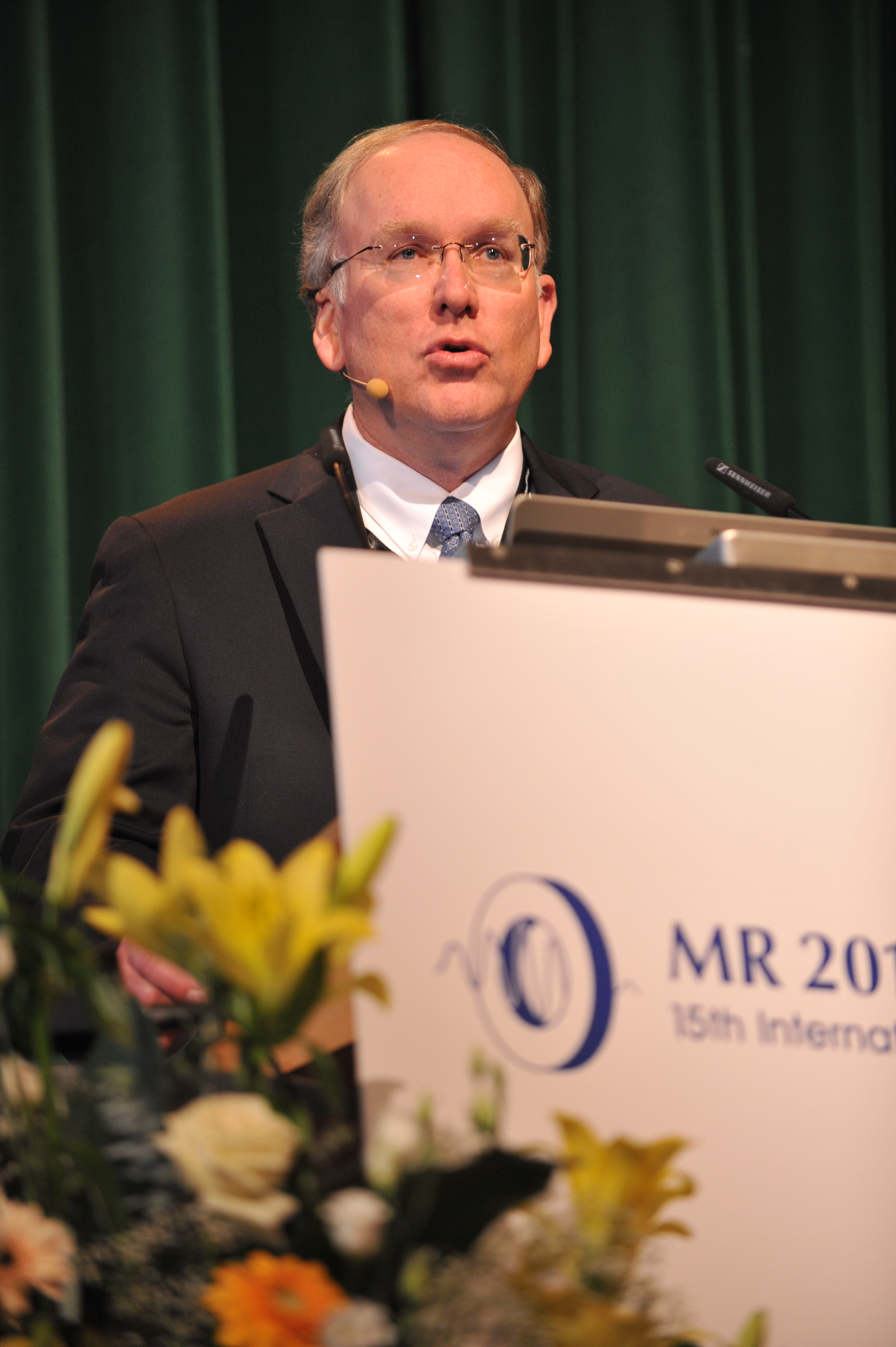
- Born: August 28, 1956 (age 70); Austin, Texas
- Education: Stanford University, Stanford University School of Medicine, Vanderbilt University Medical Center, University of Bern
- Scientific career
- Fields: Radiology
- Workplaces: University of Bern

Val Murray Runge (born August 28, 1956, in Austin, Texas) is an American and Swiss professor of radiology and the editor-in-chief of Investigative Radiology. Runge was one of the early researchers to investigate the use of gadolinium-based contrast agents for magnetic resonance imaging (MRI), giving the first presentation in this field (in 1982), followed two years later by the first presentation of efficacy (in 1984). His research also pioneered many early innovations in MRI, including the use of tilted planes (for standardization of brain imaging, in 1987) and respiratory gating (for liver imaging, in 1984). His publication on multiple sclerosis in 1984 represented the third and largest clinical series (to that date) investigating the role of MRI in this disease, and the first to show characteristic abnormalities on MRI in patients whose CT was negative.

== Biography ==
Runge was born in Austin, Texas and graduated from Stanford University with a Bachelor of Science, with honors, in Chemistry in June 1978. He subsequently received his MD from Stanford University School of Medicine in January 1982. Following completion of a diagnostic radiology residency at Vanderbilt University Medical Center in December 1985, Runge was appointed as assistant professor and chief of service of magnetic resonance at Tufts University School of Medicine in 1986. He was promoted to associate professor in 1988. In 1990 he was appointed professor of diagnostic radiology and biomedical engineering, Director of the Magnetic Resonance Imaging and Spectroscopy Center, and the Rosenbaum Endowed Chair of Diagnostic Radiology, at the University of Kentucky Medical Center. In 2002, Runge was appointed the Robert and Alma Moreton Centennial Chair in Radiology, Scott & White Memorial Hospital, and professor of radiology at the Texas A&M Health Science Center. In 2010 he was appointed the John Sealy Distinguished Chair and professor of radiology at the University of Texas Medical Branch in Galveston. In 2011, he received an additional honorary appointment as visiting professor, for 2012–2015, from Tongji Medical College, Wuhan, Central China. Runge then spent two years in Zurich, Switzerland as a visiting professor at the University Hospital of Zürich (2013-2015). Runge lives currently in Zurich, Switzerland, having a long-term appointment (2015-present) as a member of the faculty at Inselspital, Universitätsspital Bern. He received the title of Prof. Dr. med. from the University of Bern in 2019.

== Scientific career ==
Runge is an early pioneer in MRI, known for his work in 1982-1984 demonstrating for the first time the potential as well as early diagnostic utility of intravenous contrast media in MRI, specifically the gadolinium chelates.

He is an author of more than 230 peer-reviewed papers published in the scientific literature. He is also the editor for twenty-one medical textbooks, with several of these translated into other languages, including German, Chinese, Polish and Turkish. His most recent textbooks are "Neuroradiology - the Essentials with MR and CT", second edition, "Imaging of Cerebrovascular Disease", "The Physics of Clinical MR Taught Through Images", fifth edition (2022), and the second edition of "Essentials of Clinical MR". He has given more than 800 scientific and invited presentations at national and international meetings and medical schools across North America, Europe, Australia, Japan, Korea and China over the past 43 years.

Runge holds a U.S. patent (#4615879), together with Jeffrey A. Clanton, for oral particulate NMR contrast agents.

== Current activities ==
Since 1994, Runge has been editor-in-chief of Investigative Radiology (2024 Impact Factor of 8). He was also a member of the editorial boards of the Journal of Magnetic Resonance Imaging and Topics in Magnetic Resonance Imaging since their respective inceptions, in 1991 and 1988, and remained on these two editorial boards until the early 2020s. He remains active in research and development of MRI contrast agents and advanced MRI imaging techniques. In 2019, under his guidance, the first study demonstrating the toxicity of gadolinium chelates to brain tissue was published. This identifies a pathway by which linear gadolinium chelates may produce ill effects in otherwise normal patients long after injection, supporting the EMA's decision in 2017 to withdraw certain, and restrict other, agents in this category from clinical use.

== Awards and membership ==
He was elected Fellow of the International Society for Magnetic Resonance in Medicine in 1990. In 2011, Runge received the Harry Fisher Medal for Excellence in Contrast Media Research from the Contrast Media Research Society.

Other academic honors include the Executive Council Award from the American Roentgen Ray Society (for research in MRI and multiple sclerosis), the Dyke Memorial Award from the American Society of Neuroradiology (for MR contrast media research), and a Magna Cum Laude Award (for the best scientific exhibit) from the Radiological Society of North America. He is a diplomate of the American Board of Radiology (1986).

== Private life ==
Runge has two daughters and currently resides in Zurich, Switzerland.
