= Andhra (disambiguation) =

Andhra Pradesh is a state in southern India.

Andhra may also refer to:

== Places ==
- Andhra State (1953–1956), a former state in India
- Andhra Pradesh (1956–2014), successor to Andhra State, and precursor to Andhra Pradesh and Telangana, India
- Andhra University, a university in Visakhapatnam, Andhra Pradesh, India
- Andhra Bank, a former public sector bank of India

== Other uses ==
- Andhras, an ancient Indian tribe
- Andhra Dynasty or Satavahana dynasty, a South and Central Indian dynasty from 3rd century BCE–mid 3rd century CE

== See also ==
- Coastal Andhra, a geographic region in Andhra Pradesh, India
- North Andhra, a geographic region in Andhra Pradesh and , popular in India
- Andra (disambiguation)
