= Daria Mochly-Rosen =

American biologist and researcher

Daria Mochly-Rosen is a Professor of Chemical and Systems Biology at the Stanford University School of Medicine, where she also holds the George D. Smith Chair for Translational Medicine. She is in addition the founder of Mitoconix Bio, a startup company whose goal is to produce drugs that treat Huntington's disease and other neurodegenerative illnesses.
