= Linda M. Boxer =

American hematologist and academic administrator

- Education: Carleton College; Stanford University
- Scientific career
- Fields: Hematology
- Workplaces: Stanford University
- Doctoral advisor: David Korn

Linda Minium Boxer is an American hematologist and academic administrator serving as the vice dean and Stanley McCormick Memorial Professor at Stanford University School of Medicine since 2013.

== Life ==
Boxer completed a bachelor's degree in chemistry at Carleton College in 1973. She earned a M.D. and Ph.D. in biophysics from Stanford University in 1981. Her dissertation is titled, Biochemical Studies of DNA Replication: I. A DNA polymerase from Mycoplasma Orale: II. A DNA-dependent Atpase from KB Cells. David Korn was her doctoral advisor. She completed an internship and residency in internal medicine at Stanford University followed by a hematology/oncology fellowship.

From March 2004 to 2017, Boxer was chief of the division of hematology at the Stanford University School of Medicine. She was the senior vice chair of the department of medicine for one year and as the interim chair for two years. Boxer has served as the vice dean and Stanley McCormick Memorial Professor since September 2013.
