= Academic Medicine (journal) =

- Discipline: Academic medicine
- Language: English
- Edited by: Laura Weiss Roberts

Publication details
- Former names: Bulletin of the Association of American Medical Colleges, Journal of the Association of American Medical Colleges, Medical Education, Journal of Medical Education
- History: 1926-present
- Publisher: Lippincott Williams & Wilkins for the Association of American Medical Colleges (United States)
- Frequency: Monthly
- Impact factor: 5.3 (2023)

Standard abbreviations
- ISO 4: Acad. Med.

Indexing
- ISSN: 1040-2446 (print); 1938-808X (web)

Links
- Journal homepage

Academic Medicine is a monthly peer-reviewed medical journal published by Lippincott Williams & Wilkins for the Association of American Medical Colleges. It covers various aspects of medicine in academic settings like education and training issues; health and science policy; institutional policy, management, and values; research practice; and clinical practice.

== History ==
The journal was established in 1926 as the Bulletin of the Association of American Medical Colleges. It was renamed Journal of the Association of American Medical Colleges in 1929. In 1951 it briefly became Medical Education then Journal of Medical Education. In 1989 it obtained its current name. In 2015, the journal was ranked one of the top five medical education journals that received attention in social media sources, such as Twitter and Facebook.

In the course of its history, the journal has had ten editors. Laura Weiss Roberts is the present editor-in-chief, appointed in 2019.

== Abstracting and indexing ==
The journal is abstracted and indexed in:

- Index Medicus/MEDLINE/PubMed
- Science Citation Index

According to the Journal Citation Reports, the journal has a 2023 impact factor of 5.3.
