= Alex Macario =

American anesthesiologist, academic and author

- Born: Argentina
- Occupations: Anesthesiologist, academic and author
- Awards: Ellis N. Cohen Achievement Award, Stanford University; Excellence in Education Award, American Society of Anesthesiologists

Academic background
- Education: University of Rochester

Academic work
- Institutions: Stanford University School of Medicine

Alex Macario is an American anesthesiologist, academic and author. He is a vice-chair for education, a professor in the Department of Anesthesiology, Perioperative and Pain Medicine, and program director for the anesthesiology residency at Stanford University School of Medicine.

He has authored several books, including the travel memoir A Sabbatical in Madrid: A Diary of Spain.

Macario also serves on the board of directors for the American Board of Anesthesiology, and will serve as president at the end of his term. He was appointed secretary of the ABA in 2022.

== Biography ==
Macario was born in Argentina, and moved to the US with his family when he was 10. His father is a doctor. Macario attended the University of Rochester, and graduated with a bachelor's degree in sociology in 1986, and then an M.B.A. majoring in health care organizations and markets in 1988, and M.D. with distinction in research in 1990. He studied anesthesiology at Stanford and was chief resident in 1994. He was a fellow in health services research until 1995.

Macario began his academic career as clinical assistant professor in the Department of Anesthesiology in 1995, and then assistant professor in 1996. He was promoted to associate professor in 2001, and to professor in 2006.

Currently, he is also a member of the Anesthesiology Review Committee for the Accreditation Council for Graduate Medical Education, where he, along with a team sets standards for US graduate medical education (residency and fellowship) programs and the institutions that sponsor them, and renders accreditation decisions based on compliance with these standards.

== Research ==
Macario has published over 250 papers. He focuses his research on the economics of health care, with particular attention on the tradeoffs between costs and outcomes for patients having surgery and anesthesia.

In an important research project, Macario discussed the potential role of RFID chips in terms of helping surgeons avoid leaving sponges in patients, while highlighting that the risk of sponges or instruments inadvertently left in the patient's body "increases in emergencies, with unplanned changes in procedure and with patients that have a higher body-mass index." Furthermore, he examined the economics of the surgical area, showing that the high cost of surgical procedures is due to the intensity of labor and resources required in the operating room, and identified that efforts to reduce total costs of care need to address the large fraction of costs that are fixed (overhead).

Other landmark studies led by Macario took perspectives of patients regarding their preferences for postoperative anesthesia outcomes, as well as those of expert anesthesiologists to show that as the safety of anesthesia care increased in the 1980s and 1990s, a shift occurred in the focus of everyday anesthesia practice from avoiding severe and less common complications such as stroke and death to also minimizing less severe and more common side-effects such as pain, nausea and vomiting.

Macario has investigated the challenges of predictive methods for surgery duration, and highlighted the importance that the correct surgical procedure is booked, and that accurate time stamps are collected, and that even with those necessary steps illustrated that all surgical cases have variability in duration.

He published an often referenced set of metrics to measure how well an operating room suite is functioning, and described the relationship between hospital costs and patient charges as listed on the chargemaster.

== Personal life ==
Macario lives with his wife in their home on the Stanford University Campus, and has 2 adult children.

== Awards and honors ==
- 1982 – Joseph C. Wilson Scholar, University of Rochester
- 1985 – Rigby – Wile Prize in Biology, University of Rochester
- 1986 – Phi Beta Kappa, University of Rochester
- 1991 – Valdes – Dapena Research Prize, The Graduate Hospital, University of Pennsylvania
- 2001–2002 – Research Incentive Award, Stanford University Office of Technology Licensing
- 2009 – Ellis N. Cohen Achievement Award, Stanford University
- 2012 & 2013 – Faculty Mentor Award, American Society of Anesthesiology, Committee on Professional Diversity
- 2015 – Inaugural recipient, Outstanding Contribution to Graduate Medical Education as Program Director, Stanford University
- 2018 – Excellence in Education Award, American Society of Anesthesiologists

== Bibliography ==
- Macario, A., Vitez, T. S., Dunn, B., & McDonald, T. (1995). Where are the costs in perioperative care?: Analysis of hospital costs and charges for inpatient surgical care. The Journal of the American Society of Anesthesiologists, 83(6), 1138–1144.
- Macario, A., Weinger, M., Truong, P., & Lee, M. (1999). Which clinical anesthesia outcomes are both common and important to avoid? The perspective of a panel of expert anesthesiologists. Anesthesia & Analgesia, 88(5), 1085–1091.
- Dexter, F., Macario, A., Traub, R. D., Hopwood, M., & Lubarsky, D. A. (1999). An operating room scheduling strategy to maximize the use of operating room block time: computer simulation of patient scheduling and survey of patients' preferences for surgical waiting time. Anesthesia & Analgesia, 89(1), 7–20.
- Macario, A., Weinger, M., Carney, S., & Kim, A. (1999). Which clinical anesthesia outcomes are important to avoid? The perspective of patients. Anesthesia & Analgesia, 89(3), 652.
- Macario, A. (2010). What does one minute of operating room time cost?. Journal of clinical anesthesia, 4(22), 233–236.
