= Marcia Stefanick =

American medical researcher

Marcia L. Stefanick is a Professor at the Stanford University School of Medicine and Director of the Stanford Women's Health and Sex Differences in Medicine Center. Stefanick’s research investigates the role of lifestyle, particularly exercise, diet, weight control, and menopausal hormone therapy, on chronic disease prevention. Her major focus is heart disease, breast cancer, osteoporosis, and dementia.

== Early life and education ==
Stefanick was born in Hermitage, Pennsylvania, the daughter of a veterinarian. She graduated from Hickory High School in Hermitage, in 1969, then spent two years in Germany as an exchange student. She earned her BS degree in biology from University of Pennsylvania in Philadelphia in 1974. Stefanick worked at the Oregon Regional Primate Research Center. She earned her Ph.D. in Physiology from Stanford University in 1982. Stefanick served as a Fellow in Cardiac Disease Prevention at Stanford 1983 to 1986.

== Career ==
Stefanick's research focuses on chronic disease prevention in both women and men most commonly heart disease, breast cancer, osteoporosis and dementia. Stefanick serves as the Principal Investigator of the Women's Health Initiative (WHI) Extension Study which analyzes the impacts of hormone therapy on heart disease and osteoporosis. She has published with the WHI on the impact of exercise on chronic disease through the WHISH study.

Stefanick is the Principal Investigator of the WHI Strong and Healthy (WHISH) Trial. This study examines the effects of a Department of Health and Human Services-based physical activity intervention on cardiovascular events over a period of eight years. This trial encompasses a multi-ethnic cohort of 24,000 WHI participants across the U.S. and compares physical activity effects with an equal number of “usual activity” controls. WHISH participants were asked to move more and sit less; they were provided with activity trackers and monitored for cardiac health.

Stefanick is also PI on the Osteoporotic Study of Men (MrOS) which conducts clinical assessments of bone and body composition from an original cohort of nearly 6000 men, aged 65 and over, which started in 2001.

As Director of the Stanford Women’s Health and Sex Differences in Medicine (WHSDM, “wisdom”) Center, Stefanick promotes research and teaching on sex and gender in human physiology and disease. The Center promotes multi-disciplinary research on women’s health and sex differences in biology and medicine, including basic science, clinical medicine and population studies.

Stefanick in involved in leadership roles at the Stanford School of Medicine, including as co-leader of the Population Sciences Program of the Stanford Cancer Institute, Stanford’s NCI-funded comprehensive cancer center.

One part of the WHI trial was halted in 2002 since the data indicated that postmenopausal women taking combination hormone therapy have a higher risk of cardiovascular disease, stroke, blood clots and breast cancer. Stefanick's study indicated that the increased risk of breast cancer lingers after a woman stopped taking combination hormone replacement therapy. Stefanick stated that it wasn't clear if these were new cancers or existing tumors previously undetected. "The really important message for women is they need to get a mammogram if they've stopped using hormones," Stefanick said. "They shouldn't think everything is fine. They need to get a mammogram to make absolutely sure. Once they've stopped the hormones, you have a better chance of detecting them."

== Career appointments ==
Stefanick served as the Principal Investigator of the Stanford Clinical Center of the WHI Clinical Trials and Observational Study since 1994.

She served as Chair of the WHI Steering and Executive Committees from 1998-2011

Appointments at Stanford University School of Medicine

- Professor of Medicine,
- Professor of Obstetrics and Gynecology, and
- Professor of Epidemiology and Population Health

== Honors and awards ==
- Founding Director, Stanford Women's Health & Sex Differences in Medicine (WHSDM) Center (currently)
- Teaching Award, Stanford University Department of Medicine (2019-2020)
- Fellow, American Heart Association (2001–present)
- Fellow, American Heart Association Council of Arteriosclerosis, Thrombosis and Vascular Biology (1989–present)
- Fellow, American College of Sports Medicine (ASCM) (1984–present)
- 2022 - Research.com Best Female Scientist Award (https://research.com/u/marcia-l-stefanick)
