= Hronská Dúbrava =

Hronská Dúbrava Felsőbesenyő
- Municipality
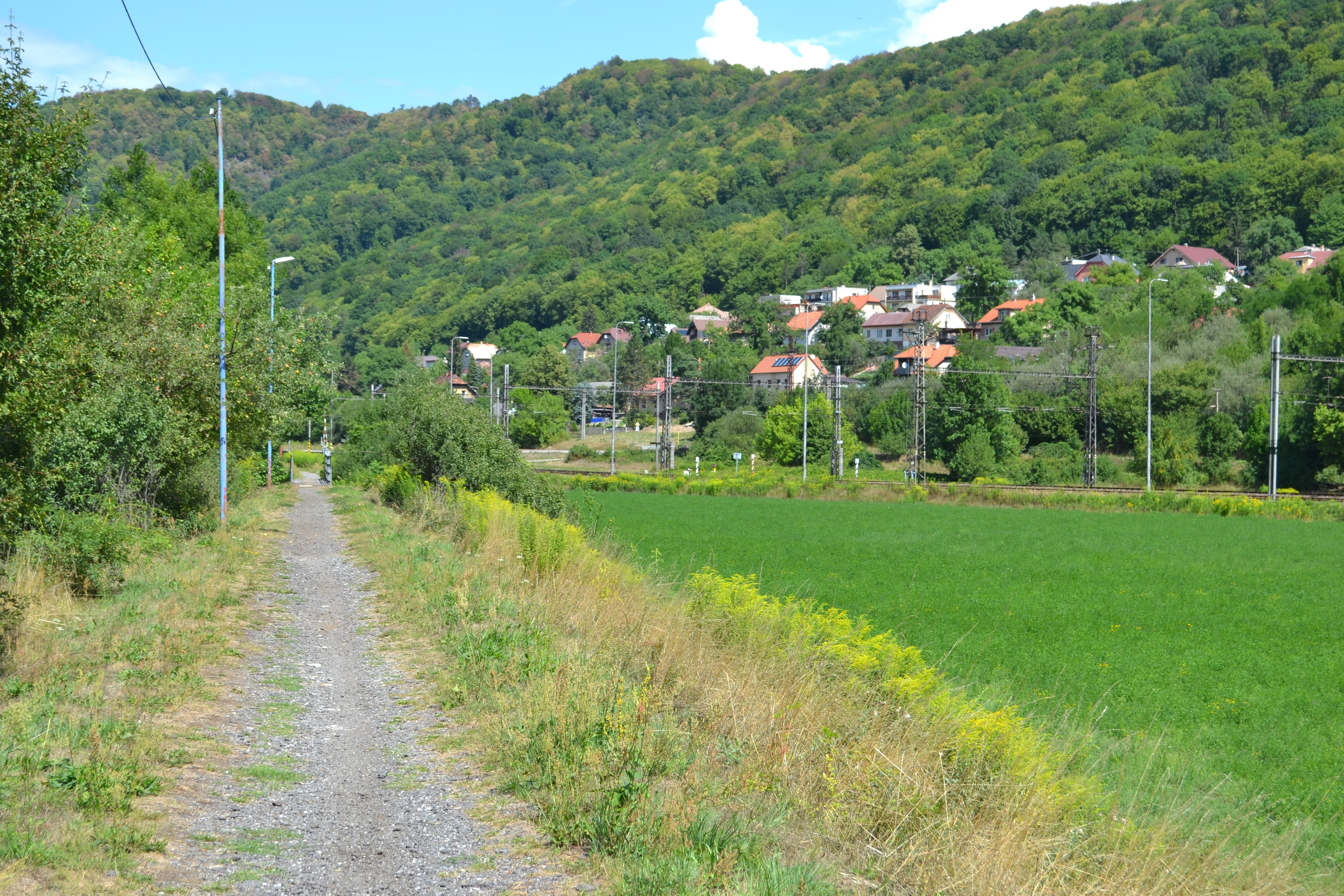

- Flag

- Location of Hronská Dúbrava in the Banská Bystrica Region Location of Hronská Dúbrava in Slovakia
- Coordinates: 48.58°N 19.00°E
- Country: Slovakia
- Region: Banská Bystrica Region
- District: Žiar nad Hronom District
- First mentioned: 1388

Government
  - Mayor: Miriam Červienkov (Ind.)

Area
  - Total: 5.04 km^{2} (1.95 sq mi)
- Elevation: 498 m (1,634 ft)

Population (2025)
  - Total: 428
- Time zone: UTC+1 (CET)
  - Summer (DST): UTC+2 (CEST)
- Postal code: 966 12
- Area code: +421 45
- Vehicle registration plate (until 2022): ZH
- Website: www.hronskadubrava.sk

Hronská Dúbrava (Hungarian: Felsőbesenyő) is a village and municipality in Žiar nad Hronom District in the Banská Bystrica Region of central Slovakia.

== Geography ==
The municipality lies at an altitude of 498 metres (1,634 ft) and covers an area of 5.04 km^{2} (1.95 sq mi) (2025).

== Population ==
Population statistic (10 years)
| Year | 1995 | 2005 | 2015 | 2025 |
|---|---|---|---|---|
| Count | 382 | 427 | 413 | 428 |
| Difference | | +11.78% | −3.27% | +3.63% |

Population statistic
| Year | 2024 | 2025 |
|---|---|---|
| Count | 419 | 428 |
| Difference | | +2.14% |

It has a population of 428 people (31 December 2025).

=== Ethnicity ===
Census 2021 (1+ %)
| Ethnicity | Number | Fraction |
|---|---|---|
| Slovak | 390 | 93.52% |
| Not found out | 17 | 4.07% |
| Romani | 5 | 1.19% |
| Total | 417 | |

In year 2021 was 417 people by ethnicity 390 as Slovak, 17 as Not found out, 5 as Romani, 3 as Other, 2 as Czech, 1 as Ukrainian, 1 as Polish and 1 as Hungarian.

Note on population: The difference values of population numbers in the table "Population statistic" and in the sections "Ethnicity" & "Religion" is caused by the use of various statistical methods.

=== Religion ===
Census 2021 (1+ %)
| Religion | Number | Fraction |
|---|---|---|
| Roman Catholic Church | 239 | 57.31% |
| None | 104 | 24.94% |
| Not found out | 34 | 8.15% |
| Evangelical Church | 32 | 7.67% |
| Total | 417 | |

In year 2021 was 417 people by religion 239 from Roman Catholic Church, 104 from None, 34 from Not found out, 32 from Evangelical Church, 2 from Seventh-day Adventist Church, 1 from Calvinist Church, 1 from Eastern Orthodox Church, 1 from Other and not ascertained christian church, 1 from Jehovah's Witnesses, 1 from Other and 1 from Ad hoc movements.

== Genealogical resources ==
The records for genealogical research are available at the state archive "Statny Archiv in Banska Bystrica, Slovakia"

- Roman Catholic church records (births/marriages/deaths): 1767-1912 (parish B)

== See also ==
- List of municipalities and towns in Slovakia
