= Andra Blomkalns =

American emergency physician

- Education: Rice University; LSU Health Sciences Center New Orleans; University of Texas at Dallas
- Scientific career
- Fields: Emergency medicine
- Workplaces: University of Cincinnati; University of Texas Southwestern Medical Center; Stanford University

Andra Leah Blomkalns is an American emergency physician working as the Redlich Family Professor and chair of the department of emergency medicine at Stanford University School of Medicine since 2018. She is a past president of the Society for Academic Emergency Medicine.

== Life ==
Andra Bomkalns speaks Latvian. She earned a bachelor's degree from Rice University. She completed a M.D. at the LSU Health Sciences Center New Orleans in 1997. In 2001, she completed an emergency medicine residency at the University of Cincinnati.

Blomkalns was a faculty member at the University of Cincinnati College of Medicine from 2003 to 2015. She served in several roles including as the vice president of education from 2003 to 2011, vice chair from 2005 to 2015, associate professor from 2007 to 2014, and professor from 2014 to 2015. She joined the department of emergency medicine at the University of Texas Southwestern Medical Center in 2015 as a professor and vice chair of academic affairs and business development.

From 2016 to 2018, Blomkalns was president of the Society for Academic Emergency Medicine. She was the division chief of general emergency medicine from 2017 to 2018. Blomkalns completed a M.B.A. specializing in innovation and entrepreneurship at the University of Texas at Dallas in 2018. In 2018, she joined the Stanford University School of Medicine as the Redlich Family Professor and chair of the department of emergency medicine.
