= Borys Karnicki =

Commander of the Polish Navy, submariner (1907–1985)

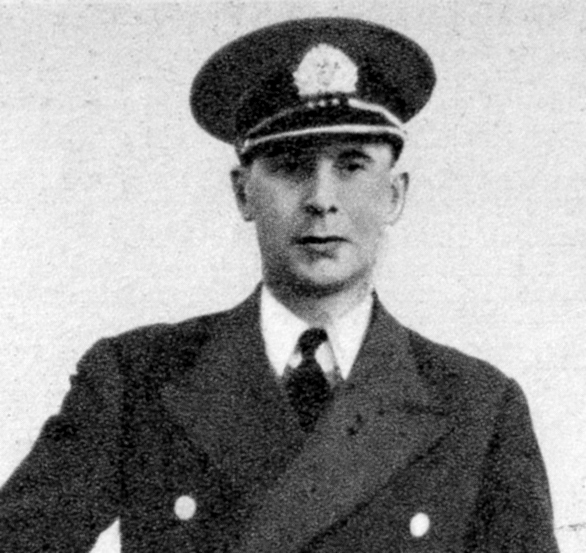
- Born: 25 September 1907; Vladivostok, Russian Empire
- Died: 15 February 1985 (aged 77); London
- Military career
- Allegiance: Poland
- Branch: Polish Navy
- Service years: 1930–1946
- Rank: Komandor porucznik Commander
- Commands: ORP Wilk; ORP Sokół
- Conflicts: World War II
- Awards: Virtuti Militari (Silver Cross); Order of Polonia Restituta (Knight's Cross; Cross of Valour; Cross of Merit; Navy Medal; Distinguished Service Order; Atlantic Star; Africa Star; Order of the Dannebrog

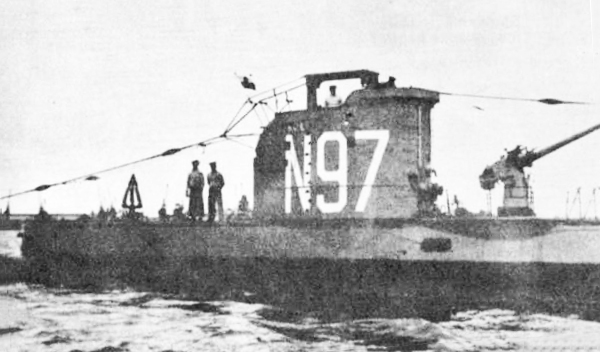
Sokół as seen in Malta, possibly in 1943

Borys Karnicki (25 September 1907 – 15 February 1985) was a submarine commander of the Polish Navy during World War II.

== Biography ==
He was the younger son of Aleksander Karnicki, a general of the Imperial Russian Army then of the Polish Army. In 1927 Borys graduated in Bydgoszcz. He finished the Polish Naval Academy in 1930. He served on the torpedo boat ORP Podhalanin then on the submarines ORP Żbik, ORP Ryś and finally ORP Wilk. He completed a course of naval artillery and the submarine navigation course.

At the outbreak of war he was the executive officer on the ORP Wilk. After unsuccessful patrols in the Baltic Sea, Wilk passed the Danish Straits (Øresund) on 14/15 September and arrived at Scotland. During the long months the crew has nothing to be proud of. Moral was low. On 13 April 1940 he became the commanding officer of Wilk. On 20 June 1940 at 0.25 am, the ORP Wilk rammed an unidentified object at position 56°54′N 03°30′E. It is probable that it was a German U-boat U-102 or U-122 (both disappeared in June or July). Some suggested, that it might have been an Allied Dutch submarine O13, also lost at sea around that time. According to newest analysis of Wilk's damages the object was most likely a buoy. H.R. Bachmann and Jerzy Pertek noted that in the Wilk's ship's logbook there is no mention of ramming an U-boat.

At the same time, when it became clear that ORP Orzeł was definitely lost, the Royal Navy decided to lease an U-class submarine to Polish Navy. The vessel was named ORP Sokół. On 19 January 1941 Karnicki became its commander. He patrolled the Bay of Biscay off the French port of Brest. Then he was moved to Malta and participated in the attack of Pylos after which the general Władysław Sikorski decorated him with the Virtuti Militari Cross (he took it off his own breast).

ORP Sokół and the other Polish submarine operating in the Mediterranean ORP Dzik gained the name of Terrible Twins because of their achievements. After the war ended Karnicki remained in exile in England where he died on 15 February 1985. After cremation at Lewisham in southeast London, the urn with his ashes was brought home by his wife and daughters, and was buried in the Polish Naval Cemetery in Gdynia.

== Awards and decorations ==
Virtuti Militari, Silver Cross (Poland)
Order of Polonia Restituta Knight's Cross
Cross of Valour (Poland)
Cross of Merit with Swords (Poland) Golden Cross
Naval Medal three times
Distinguished Service Order
Atlantic Star
Africa Star
Order of the Dannebrog
