= Opposing forces in the Polish September Campaign =

Forces in WWII

The main opposing forces in the Polish September Campaign, which marked the beginning of the Second World War in Europe, consisted of Germany (with support from Slovakia) on one side, and Poland on the other. The Soviet Union also invaded Poland from the east during the campaign.

Tactics and military hardware used in the Invasion of Poland varied between the two sides; The German economy was geared toward military production which supplied their armed forces with equipment that was often superior to their Polish counterparts. Old tactics such as Vernichtungsgedanke and the concept of the Schwerpunkt combined with newly mechanized units punched holes in Polish lines and close air support provided by the world class Luftwaffe disrupted Polish supply and communications lines. Other German tactics included the targeting of civilian targets in terror bombings to inflict huge losses amongst the civilian population, sending streams of refugees out of afflicted areas, thereby hampering Polish logistics. In 1939 the German navy also had an advantage over the tiny Polish fleet.

Preparations for a defensive war with Germany were ongoing for many years but most plans assumed fighting would not begin before 1942. The Polish Army had about a million soldiers, but fewer than half had been mobilised by 1 September due to political pressure from France and Britain. The Polish-Soviet War showed Poland the benefits of mobility in military conflicts but Polish officials were unwilling (and unable) to invest heavily to make that a reality. Polish Cavalry Brigades were still effectively used as mobile infantry but in the end fell against German motorized units, however Germany also used cavalry for transportation during the September Campaign. The Polish Air Force lacked modern fighter aircraft for its highly trained pilots, while the Luftwaffe was much more numerous and had superior aircraft. The Polish Navy was a small fleet composed of destroyers and submarines, some of which survived the campaign by escaping to the North Sea to join with the Royal Navy.

== Germany ==
Germany was only moderately prepared for the invasion of Poland; stocks of ammunition and replacement vehicles, for example, were low, and historians regard Hitler's move as a military gamble as well as a political one. The German economy had for years geared toward production of military equipment and supplies, and was capable of creating an army that could successfully invade its neighbours only if the campaign was not a long one. In fact, in January 1939, while planning for the invasion of Poland was underway, the Wehrmacht's allocation of raw materials was cut, by some 30 percent of steel, 20 percent in copper, 47 percent in aluminum and 14 percent in rubber. Moreover, the German economy was never fully mobilized for war, with Joseph Goebbels belatedly calling for "Total War" only in 1943. Millions of Reichsmarks went into consumer goods, the female population was never harnessed efficiently for use in war production (James Lucas notes in his book Reich that 1 million German women were employed as hairdressers as late as 1943 instead of in armaments or war related industry), and many workers in the German war economy later in the war were unwilling slave labourers. As early as 1940, British production "though still lackadaisical, outstripped that of Germany in aircraft, tanks and heavy guns, in everything in fact except equipment for a large army." (A.J.P. Taylor, The Second World War, 1975).

The Polish Campaign, and the spectre of war with Britain and France, did not change things. Walter Warlimont, who headed the Department of Home Defence for the Wehrmacht, wrote postwar:

In the fact of the successful Polish campaign, Hitler (still) refused to order mobilisation in the full sense of the word; later on, partial mobilisation was ordered, but the economy was specifically exempted...None of the carefully thought-out measures designed to protect the armament industry by keeping its skilled workers on the job was put into effect. (Quoted in Brute Force (Ellis, Viking Penguin, 1990))

=== Wehrmacht ===
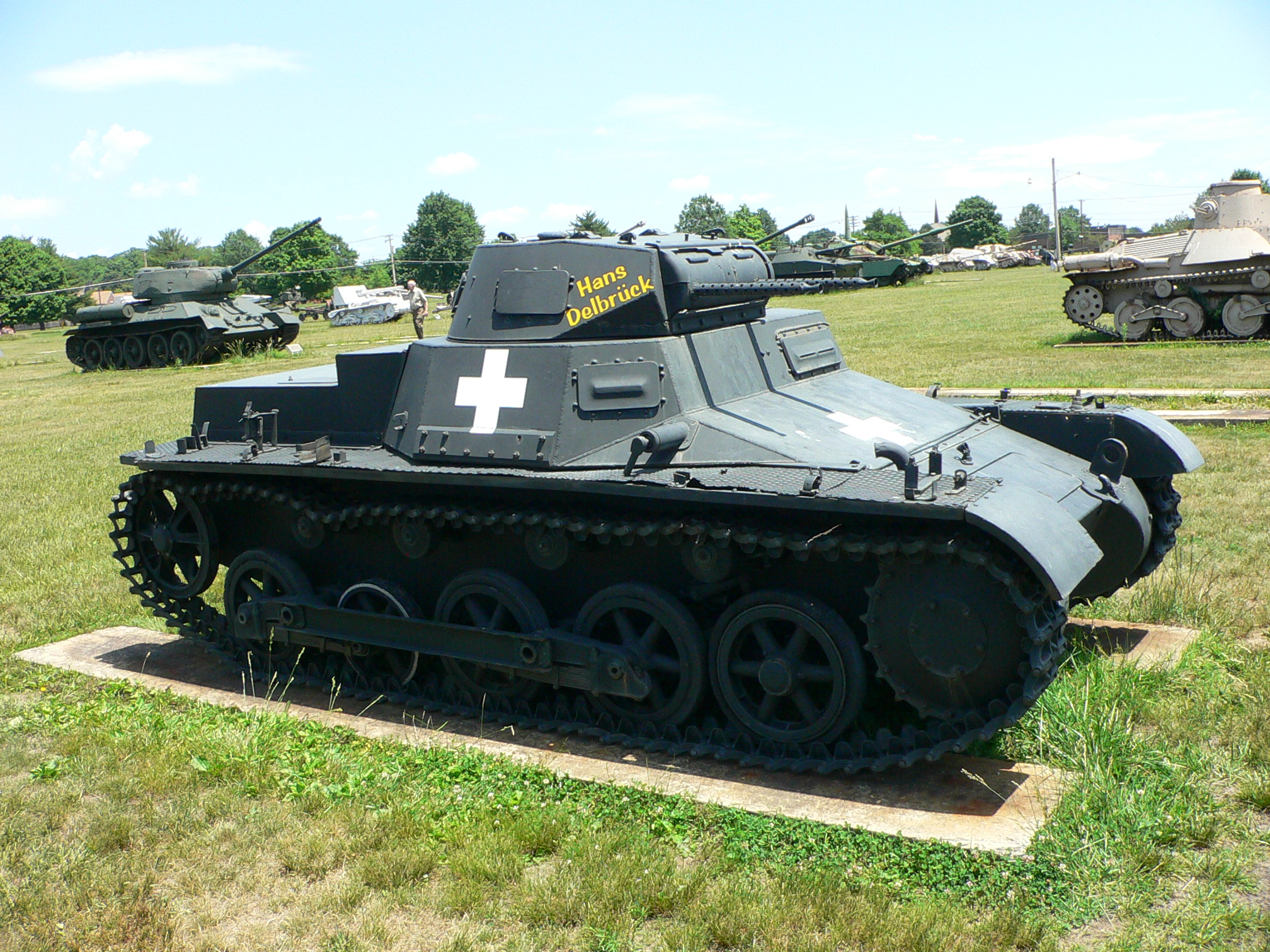
Panzer I tank

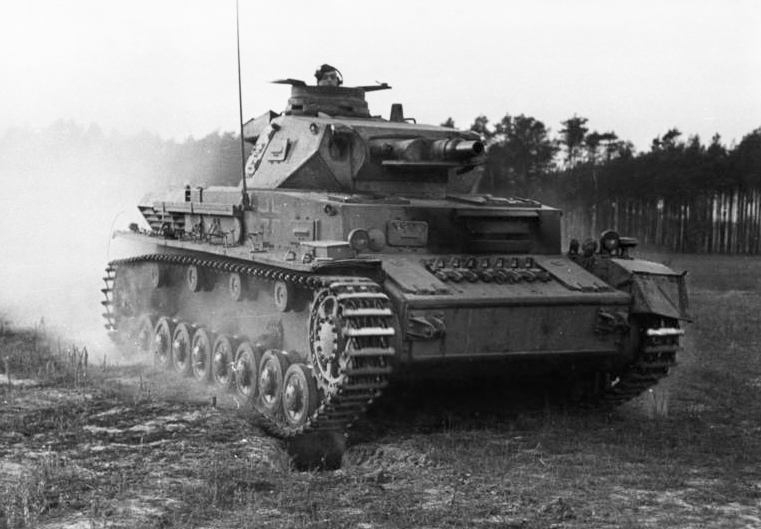
Panzer IV tank

The German military was collectively known as the Wehrmacht, and all three components had separate but related roles to play in the campaign. The firepower of a German infantry division far exceeded that of a Polish (as well as French and British) infantry division. The standard Heer infantry division on the eve of the Second World War included 442 machine guns, 135 mortars, 72 antitank guns, and 24 howitzers.

Germany had not only a large numerical advantage over Polish forces, but their organisation and command structure was much more efficient. While German forces were not as mobile or numerous as they would be in the later stages of the Second World War, the Wehrmacht had some 2,400 tanks organized into six armoured (panzer) divisions using operational doctrine developed during and after the First World War, coupled with older concepts such as Vernichtungsgedanken. German tanks of this period Panzer I, Panzer II, Panzer III and the most advanced Panzer IV. In accordance with the ideas of Heinz Guderian, German tanks and mechanized support units (motorized artillery, etc.) were used in massive, mechanized spearhead (Schwerpunkt) attacks, serving as highly mobile units to punch holes in the enemy line and isolate selected enemy units, which the infantry would then encircle and destroy while the armored and mechanized forces pushed forward to repeat the process, eventually breaking through enemy frontlines and then dispersing, causing confusion in the rear areas and severing lines of supply and communication.

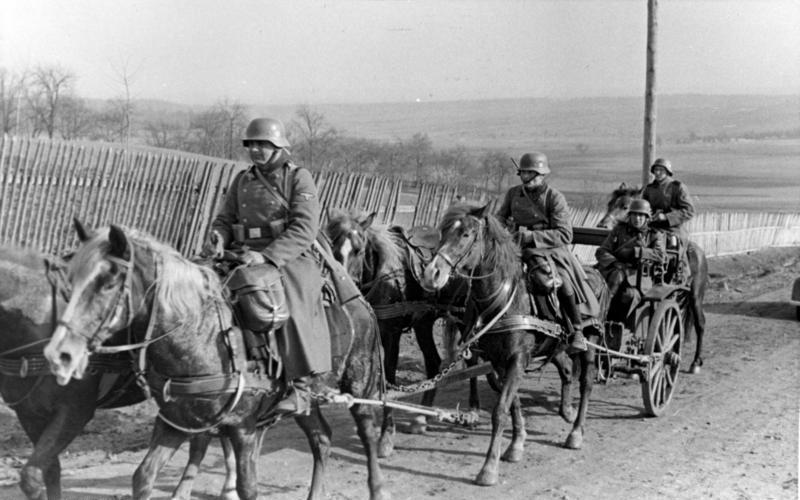
The 1939 Kavallerie Waffen-SS in Poland

Less mobile mechanized infantry and regular infantry (who, along with their horse-drawn artillery support, vastly outnumbered their mechanized comrades) would then in theory follow-up the panzer divisions' penetration into enemy territory. The Heer was closely supported by the Luftwaffe, especially by dive bombers that attacked and disrupted the enemy's supply and communications lines and spread panic and confusion in its rear, thus further paralyzing the enemy's defensive capabilities. Mechanization was the key to this German tactic first revealed in the September Campaign and nicknamed blitzkrieg (lightning war) by contemporary journalists, who found the name fitting because of the unprecedented speed and mobility that were its underlying characteristics.

Despite the term blitzkrieg being coined by the Allies during the Polish September Campaign of 1939, historians (such as Matthew Cooper) generally hold that German operations in Poland were more traditional than revolutionary. Cooper, for one, writes (in The German Army (1976)) that Heer strategy was more inline with Vernichtungsgedanken, or a focus on envelopment to create pockets in broad-front annihilation. Mechanized forces were deployed among the three German concentrations without strong emphasis on independent use, being used to create or destroy close pockets of Polish forces and seize operational-depth terrain in support of the largely unmotorized infantry which followed.

==== Luftwaffe ====
Aircraft (particularly fighter and ground attack aircraft) played a major role in the fighting. Bomber aircraft purposely attacked cities and civilian targets causing huge losses amongst the civilian population in what became known as terror bombings. The Luftwaffe forces consisted of 1,180 fighter aircraft (mainly Bf 109s), 290 Ju 87 Stuka dive bombers, 290 conventional bombers (mainly of the He 111 and Do 17 types), and an assortment of 240 naval aircraft. In total, Germany had close to 3,000 aircraft (~2,000 of them can be considered militarily modern) with half of them deployed on the Polish front.

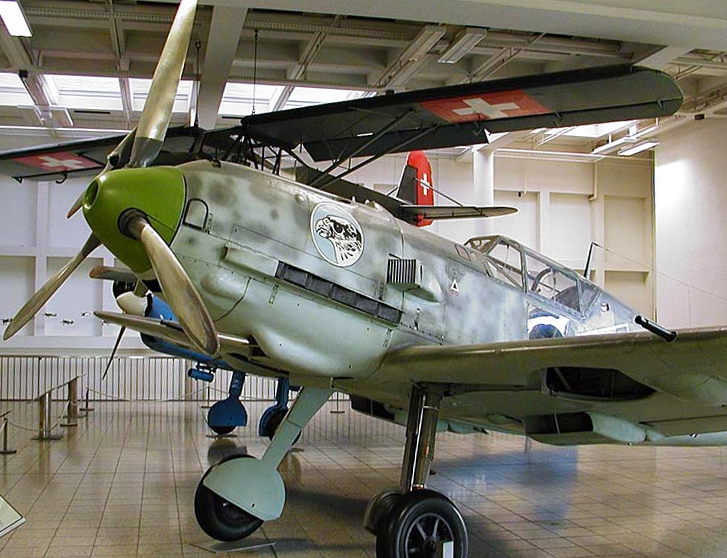
Bf 109E, advanced German fighter

The German Air Force, or Luftwaffe, was also the best force of its kind in 1939. It was designed to support the army, but in air combat the German planes were superior to most designs fielded by the Allies. In the rearmament period from 1935 to 1939, the production of German combat aircraft steadily mounted, and the standardization of engines and airframes gave the Luftwaffe a repair and production advantage over its opponents.

==== Kriegsmarine ====
At sea, the odds against the German Kriegsmarine were less favorable. They were much worse in September 1939 than in August 1914, as the Allies had many more large surface warships than Germany. However, the naval theater, for Germany, was of least significance. During the entire war there was to be no major encounter between the Allied and the German surface fleets, nothing that resembled the battle of Jutland from the previous war. Kriegsmarine activities saw only the individual operation of German pocket battleships and commerce raiders, with the rare exceptions of operations like the Operation Rheinübung, and submarine-driven Battle of the Atlantic. That noted, in 1939 Germany did have an advantage over the tiny Polish fleet, and the Western Allies were unwilling and unprepared to challenge the Kriegsmarine on the small, land-locked Baltic Sea.

=== Slovakia ===
The six months old Slovak Republic had an army composed of Slovak units of the former Czechoslovak Army. When Germany asked for Slovak assistance in invading Poland, Field Army Bernolák, under the command of Slovak Minister of War Ferdinand Čatloš was formed and invaded the country together with German forces on 1 September. Slovak troops faced the Polish Karpaty Army, and captured the towns of Javorina, Jurgów, and Zakopane. At the end of the campaign, Field Army Bernolák had suffered 37 dead, 114 wounded, and 11 missing.

== Poland ==
Between 1936 and 1939, Poland invested heavily in industrialization of the Centralny Okręg Przemysłowy, chosen for being reasonably far from both the Soviet and German frontiers. That heavy spending on military industry pushed much of the spending on actual weapons into 1940–42. Poland had been preparing for defensive war for many years; however, most plans assumed German aggression would not happen before 1942. Polish military industry development and fortifications were scheduled to be completed in that year, and newer tanks and aircraft were just entering production or would shortly.

Starting in September 1936, France loaned Poland 2.6 billion francs over a 5-year period, which added 12% to the annual Polish military budget. The Polish defense budget for 1938–39 was 800 million zlotys, of which:

- Armored force—13.7 million
- Artillery—16 million
- Air Force—46.3 million
- Navy—21.7 million
- Cavalry—58 million

To raise funds for industrial development, Poland was selling much of the modern equipment it produced; for example, anti-tank guns were sold to Britain and planes were exported to Greece.

=== Polish Army ===
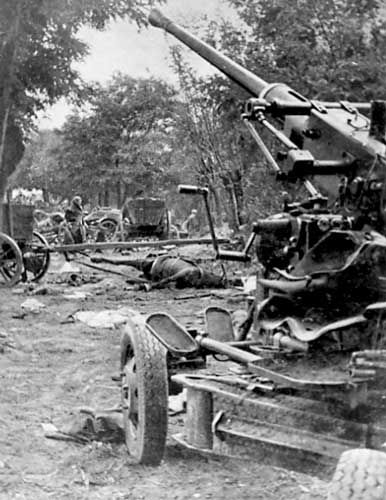
Polish Bofors AA gun and a bombed column of Polish Army during the battle of Bzura

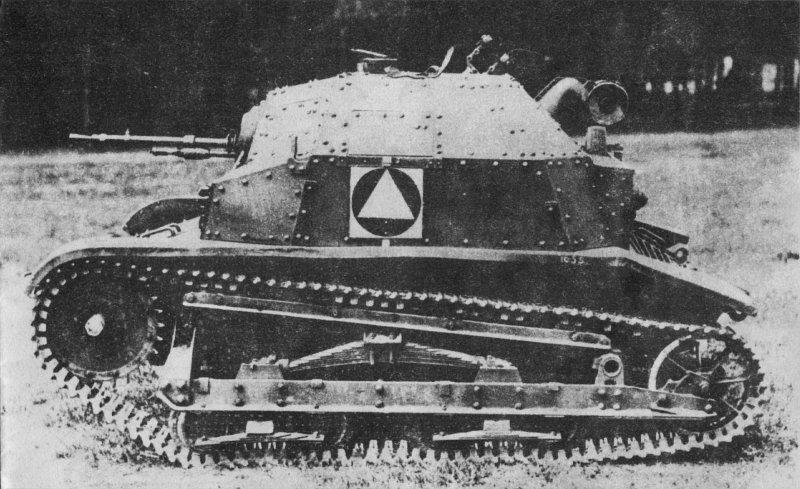
TKS tankette

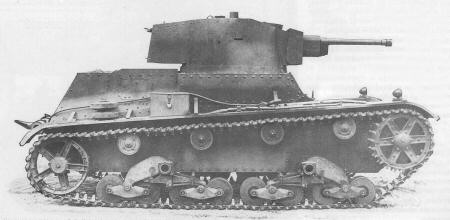
7TP, a Polish modern light tank

The Polish Army was fairly strong in numbers (~1 million soldiers), but much of it was not mobilised by 1 September, as the Polish government, advised in this by the British and French governments, constantly hoped that the war could be resolved (at least for the time being) through diplomatic channels. Less than half of the Polish armed forces had been mobilized by 1 September, and only one-quarter (250,000) were fully equipped and in assigned positions when hostilities commenced. Thus many soldiers, mobilised after 1 September, failed to reach the designated staging areas and, together with normal civilians, sustained significant casualties when public transport (trains and roads filled with refugees) became targets of the German Air Force.

Poland possessed numerically inferior armoured forces, and they were dispersed within the infantry and unable to effectively engage in any major armoured battles. The Germans opposing them had close to 3,000 tanks organised into independent divisions under blitzkrieg doctrine. In terms of equipment, the Poles had 132 of their own 7TP tanks, which were capable of destroying any German armour, including their heaviest Panzer IV, and had a few relatively modern imported designs, such as 50 Renault R35 tanks and 38 Vickers E tanks. Of the 700 odd tanks remaining, 102 were obsolete First World War Renault FT tanks and, not much better than armoured cars, 300 TK-3 and 274 TKS tankettes. In addition to tanks, Poland successfully used 10 regular armoured trains against German forces, which were unprepared to face this kind of combat vehicle considered in 1939 so obsolete by German planners to be given any serious consideration.

Experience in the Polish-Soviet War (1919–1921), the only recent, major conflict the independent Second Polish Republic took part in, shaped Polish Army organisational and operational doctrine. Unlike the First World War, this was a conflict in which the cavalry's mobility played a decisive role. Thus the Polish high command drew a lesson different from both the Western Allies and Germany with their western front experience. With their victory in the First World War, France and Britain remained conservative and expected the new conflict to be another of trench warfare. German military theories were based upon the notion that successful offenses would be based on new inventions—tanks and planes. Poland stood in the middle: acknowledging the benefits of mobility but unwilling (and unable) to invest heavily in the expensive and unproven new inventions, it turned to cavalry, which the Polish Army considered its elite corps. During the September Campaign, the Polish Cavalry would prove to be much more successful than anybody, the Germans included, could have anticipated. Polish Cavalry brigades were used as a mobile infantry and were quite successful against German infantry. Cavalry charges were rare but successful, especially when used against infantry in un-entrenched positions. However, while Polish cavalry matched German panzers in speed and anti-infantry effectiveness, in the end it simply could not stand its ground against tanks.

Among the interesting equipment Polish forces used with success was the 7.92 mm Karabin przeciwpancerny wz.35 anti-tank rifle. It was quite successful against German light tanks, although, as with most of modern Polish equipment, production was just beginning when the war started, and thus wasn't fielded in numbers large enough to significantly change the outcome of the war.

- Tanks
  - TK-3 and TKS, tankettes
  - 7TP, a light tank
- Anti-tank gun
  - Bofors wz.37

=== Polish Air Force ===
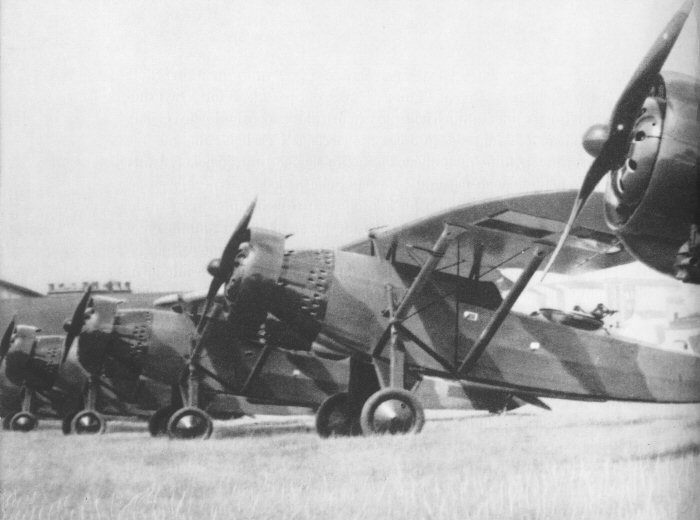
Lublin R-XIIID

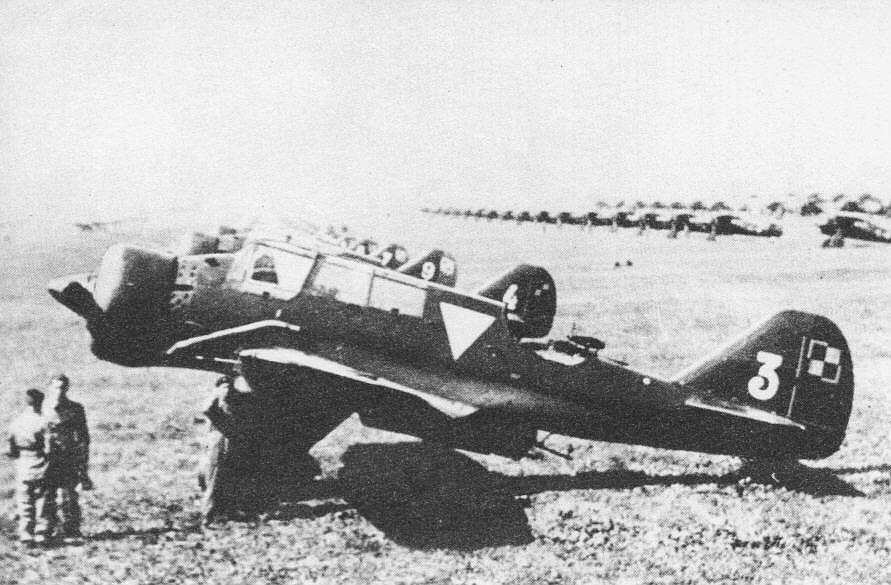
PZL.23A Karaś on the Warsaw Airport. Note lines of PZL P.11 or PZL P.7 fighters in the background

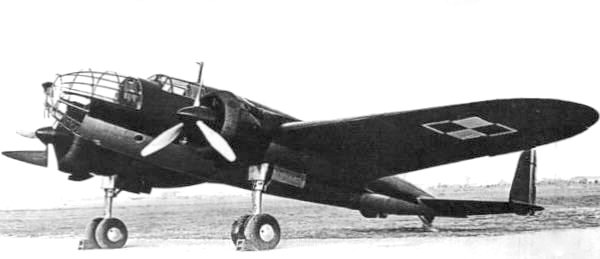
PZL.37, modern Polish bomber

The Polish Air Force was at a severe disadvantage against the Luftwaffe. Although its pilots were highly trained, the Polish Air Force lacked modern fighter aircraft, and the Germans had gross numerical superiority: Poland had approximately 400 modern and semi-modern aircraft (and another 400 obsolete transport, recon and training aircraft), including 169 fighters, and Germany had approximately 3,000 aircraft (albeit only half that number on the Polish front, with most of the remaining similarly as obsolete as the second 400 Polish aircraft). The Polish Air Force development program was slowed in 1926 in the aftermath of Józef Piłsudski's May coup d'état, as Piłsudski considered the air force to be of less importance than other military branches.

In 1939, the Polish main fighter, the PZL P.11, designed in the early 1930s, was becoming obsolete. The slightly better PZL P.24 was used solely for export, and PZL.50s and several other projects, which were supposed to have better parameters than contemporary German fighters, were still during prototype's tests. As a result, the German Messerschmitt Bf 109 and Bf 110 fighters were faster and better-armed than anything the Poles had in 1939, and most German bombers could also outrun the Polish fighters. On the other hand, P.11s were more maneuverable, and despite the German superiority in speed, armament and numbers, P.11s downed a considerable number of German aircraft, including fighters. The exact numbers are not verified, but some sources claim that at least one German aircraft was shot down for each P.11 lost (a figure of 107 to 141 German aircraft shot down for the loss of 118 Polish aircraft is most often given).

One of the most interesting units in the Polish Air Force arsenal was the PZL.37 Łoś twin-engine medium bomber. Before the war it was one of the world's most modern and outstanding bombers. Smaller than most contemporary medium bombers, it was still able to carry a heavier bomb load than comparable aircraft, including the famous Vickers Wellington. It was relatively fast and easy to handle, and thanks to a landing gear with double wheels, it could operate from rough fields or meadows. The only drawback was its relatively weak defensive armament, consisting of 3 machine guns. Its range was also limited, but the Łoś was not meant to be a long-range bomber. During the September Campaign, despite their good performance, they were too few in number to change the outcome and, often lacking fighter cover, sustained heavy losses, especially when used to attack armoured columns.

Few Polish Air Force planes were destroyed on the ground as most had been deployed to temporary, secret airstrips. The fighter planes were grouped in 15 escadres. Five of them constituted the Pursuit Brigade (Brygada Pościgowa), deployed in the Warsaw area. The bombers, grouped in 9 escadres of the Bomber Brigade (Brygada Bombowa), attacked armoured columns, suffering heavy losses. Seven reconnaissance and 12 observation escadres, attached to various Polish Armies, were intensively used for reconnaissance. However, the Polish pilots, while highly trained and motivated, faced a numerically superior opponent in superior designs with a much better command structure. Germany achieved air superiority around day three of the campaign, although the Polish Air Force managed to remain operational for the first two weeks of the September Campaign. At that point, the Polish Air Force ceased to exist as a fighting force, as most of its planes were either destroyed in combat or, facing rapidly advancing German troops, had to be abandoned on the ground due to lack of supplies and spare parts. A few remaining aircraft were either captured by the Germans or withdrawn to Romania and taken over by that country. A great number of pilots and air crews managed to break through to France and later Britain through various routes.

- Aircraft:
  - PZL P.7, fighter
  - PZL P.11, fighter
  - PZL.23 Karaś, light bomber and reconnaissance aircraft
  - PZL.37 Łoś, twin-engine medium bomber
  - Lublin R-XIII, observation, close reconnaissance and army cooperation plane,
  - RWD-14 Czapla, observation, close reconnaissance and army cooperation plane
  - RWD-8, training and liaison aircraft

=== Polish Navy ===
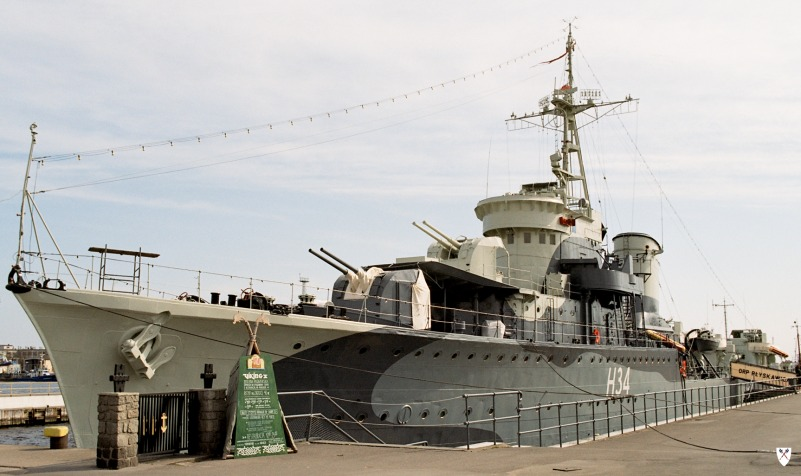
ORP Błyskawica, Polish destroyer

The Polish Navy was a small fleet composed of destroyers and submarines. Most Polish surface units followed Operation Peking, leaving Polish ports on 20 August, evading German forces and escaping to the North Sea to join with the British Royal Navy. Submarine forces were participating in Operation Worek, with the goal of engaging and damaging German shipping in the Baltic Sea, but with much less success.

- Warships (in service during September 1939)
  - Gryf, large minelayer, sunk by German bombers in Hel base
  - Błyskawica, a destroyer, escaped to United Kingdom
  - Wicher, a destroyer, sunk by German bombers in Hel base
  - Grom, a destroyer, escaped to United Kingdom
  - Burza, a destroyer, escaped to United Kingdom
  - Orzeł, a submarine, escaped to United Kingdom
  - Sęp, a submarine, interned in Sweden
  - Wilk, a submarine, escaped to United Kingdom
  - Ryś, a submarine, interned in Sweden
  - Żbik, a submarine, interned in Sweden
  - Mewa, Jaskółka, Rybitwa, Czajka, Żuraw, Czapla - 6 small minesweepers. ORP Mewa, Jaskółka and Czapla were sunk by German bombers near Hel and Oksywie, others have been captured and salvaged by Germans.
  - Mazur, an artillery training ship - and old torpedoboat from First World War, sunk by German bombers in Hel
  - Two gunboats

In addition, many ships of the Polish Merchant Navy joined the British merchant fleet and took part in various convoys during the war.

== Soviet Union ==
Nazi Germany and the Soviet Union had negotiated about the upcoming invasion of Poland prior to signing the Molotov–Ribbentrop pact. The Soviet Union had been promised half of Poland if they helped the Germans to conquer the country. In the event, the German invasion began on 1 September 1939 but the Soviet Union held back until 17 September. When the Soviets attacked, Polish forces were forming a bridgehead in south-eastern Poland where they intended to make a last stand against the Germans - and if overwhelmed, to cross the border into Romania and make their way to the west to continue the fight from there. The Soviet invasion of Poland not only wrecked this plan, but also forced the Polish government to leave the country.

The Polish government had relocated to the south-eastern town of Kuty on 17 September 1939 and held a cabinet meeting at 4pm, in full knowledge that Soviet forces were advancing rapidly towards them. It was concluded that they should cross the border into Romania, and from there go on to France. Most of Poland's highest government officials evacuated to Romania on the night of 17–18 September.

The Soviet invasion destroyed the possibility of any further coordinated military action by Poland against the Germans. Nevertheless, the Poles kept on fighting - the last significant battle which organised Polish forces took part in was at Kock, which ended on 6 October. The Polish government refused to surrender or negotiate a peace, and instead ordered all units to evacuate Poland with the aim of eventually reorganising in France. The Soviet invaders were met with only sporadic resistance, most notably in the Battle of Szack when Polish artillery wiped out an entire brigade of Soviet tanks. The Soviet Union lost 1,500 men during the invasion.

== Notes and references ==
- Majer, Diemut (2003). "Non-Germans" under the Third Reich: the Nazi judicial and administrative system in Germany and occupied Eastern Europe with special regard to occupied Poland, 1939—1945. JHU Press. pp. 188–9. ISBN 0-8018-6493-3.
- Michael Alfred Peszke, Polish Underground Army, the Western Allies, and the Failure of Strategic Unity in World War II, McFarland & Company, 2004, ISBN 0-7864-2009-X, Google Print, p. 2
- Telegram: His Majesty's Ambassador in Berlin. "Wehrmacht forces available to Britain." Text version, original document.
- Reply of the German Chancellor to the Communication of 28 August 1939, from His Majesty's Government Cited in the British Blue Book.
- Knickerbocker, H.R. (1941). Is Tomorrow Hitler's? 200 Questions on the Battle of Mankind. Reynal & Hitchcock. pp. 29–30. ISBN 9781417992775.
