= Karnitsky =

Karnitsky (Belarusian: Карнiцкi) is a surname. Notable people with the surname include:

- Alyaksandr Karnitsky (born 1989), Belarusian footballer
- Valery Karnitsky (born 1991), Belarusian footballer

A Polish form of the name is Karnicki

- Borys Karnicki
