= Jerzy Koziołkowski =

Polish officer and submariner (1911–1990)

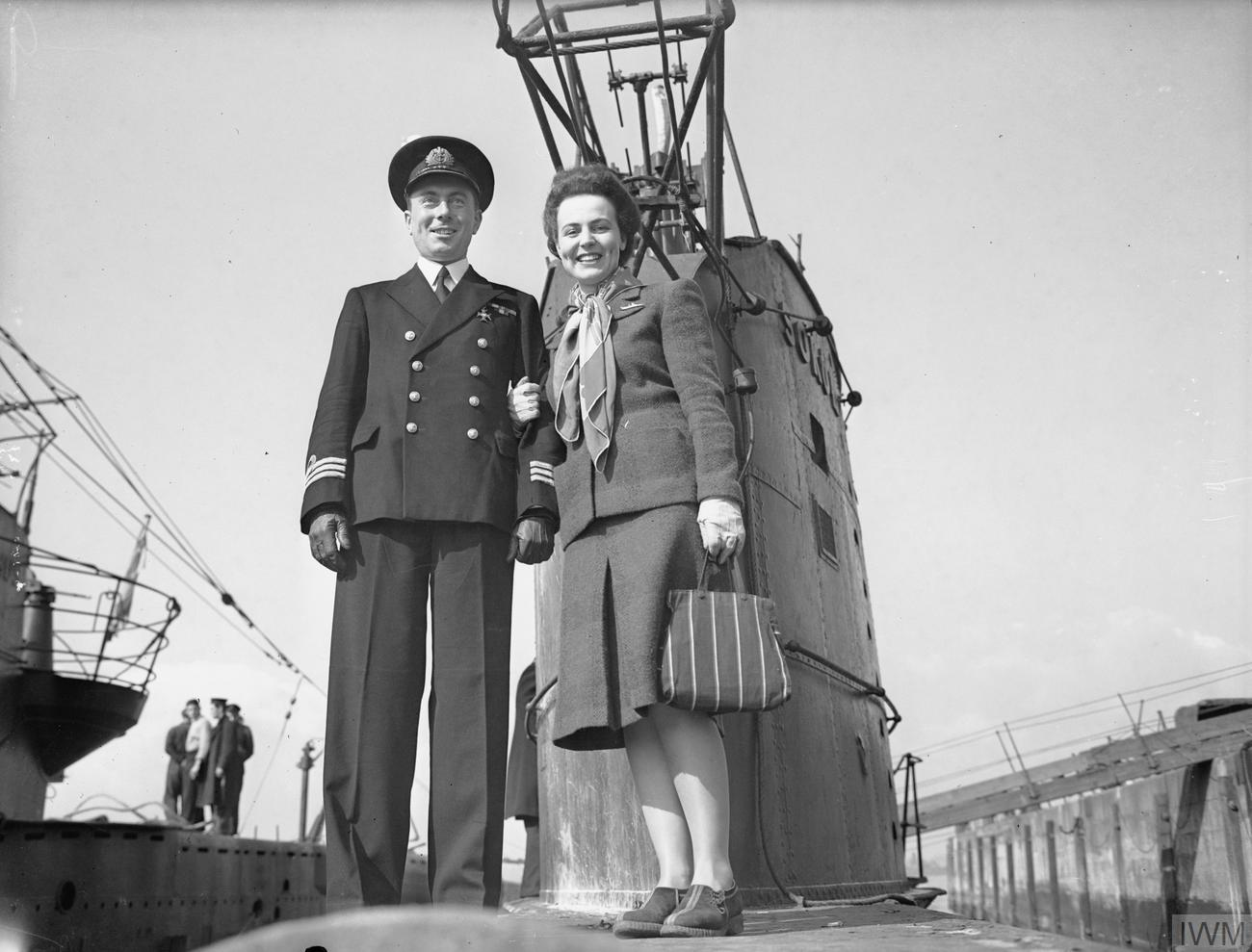
- Lieutenant Jerzy "George" Koziołkowski with his wife
- Born: 20 March 1911; Tarnów, Austria-Hungary (present day Poland)
- Died: 27 July 1990 (aged 79); Tarnów
- Military career
- Allegiance: Poland
- Branch: Polish Navy
- Service years: 1932–1947
- Rank: Komandor porucznik Captain
- Commands: ORP Kujawiak; ORP Sokół
- Conflicts: World War II
- Awards: Virtuti Militari (Silver Cross); Cross of Valour; Cross of Merit; Distinguished Service Cross; Navy Cross

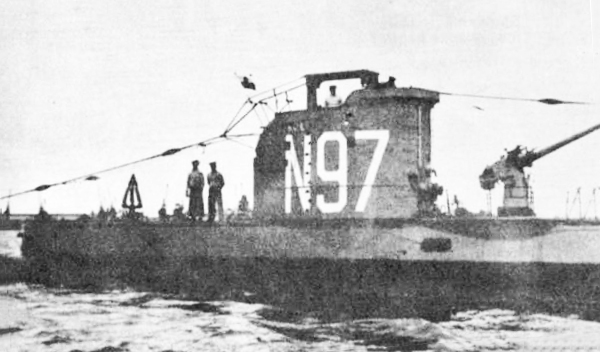
Sokół as seen in Malta, possibly in 1943

Jerzy Karol Koziołkowski (20 March 1911 – 27 July 1990) was a submarine commander of the Polish Navy during World War II.

== Biography ==
He was the son of Stanisław, an engineer employed by the municipal power plant in Tarnów, and Helena Łozińska, who died when Jerzy was one year old. After completing primary school he moved with his family to Kielce where he graduated in 1929. He entered the Polish Navy Academy and became sub-lieutenant (podporucznik) on 15 August 1932. He was sent to the Pinsk Flotilla. From 1933 to 1934 he attended a course in the École d'application des enseignes de vaisseaux, during which he took an instructional cruise on the French cruiser Jeanne d'Arc. In 1934 he served on the destroyer ORP Wicher, in the next year he completed an underwater listening course in the Centre d'études de la Marine in Toulon. From May to July 1938 he served as commander of the torpedo boat ORP Kujawiak.

During the September Campaign he took part to Battle of Hel. On 14 September he arrived to Riga on the fishing boat Albators. After a short stay in the internment camp he escaped by plane to Sweden and from there via Norway to Aberdeen, where he arrived on 31 December 1939. From 15 January 1940 he served on the submarine ORP Wilk. In September 1941 he was transferred to the ORP Sokół. On 18 August 1942 he was named commander of his vessel and took part to the operations in the Mediterranean. His ship was attached to the 10th Submarine Flotilla based at Malta. On 12 September 1943 Sokół was the first allied vessel to enter the port of Brindisi receiving the surrender of the local authorities. On 7 October he sank a German troopship Eridania (7094 tons), the largest ship sunk by the Polish Navy. After returning to the United Kingdom in late March 1944 and a renovation Sokół patrolled the coast of Norway. On 12 December 1944 he became the Deputy head at the Navy specialists training Centre (Centrum Wyszkolenia Specjalistów Floty).

After the war ended he decided to stay in the West. He was a co-founder and the first secretary of the Navy Association (Stowarzyszenie Marynarki Wojennej), and a member of the Polish Resettlement Corps. He led commercial law agency. In 1952 he moved to Canada and graduated from the University of Ottawa. He specialized in the resocialization of young people. In the years 1966 – 1976 he was a university teacher. He became a Canadian citizen and worked as adviser to the Government of Canada. He was a member of the Royal Canadian Naval Reserve. It was not until 1974 that he returned for the first time in Poland.

Jerzy Koziołkowski died suddenly during a visit to his fatherland in 1990.

== Awards and decorations ==
Virtuti Militari, Silver Cross
Cross of Valour
Cross of Merit
Navy Medal
Distinguished Service Cross

== Military promotions ==
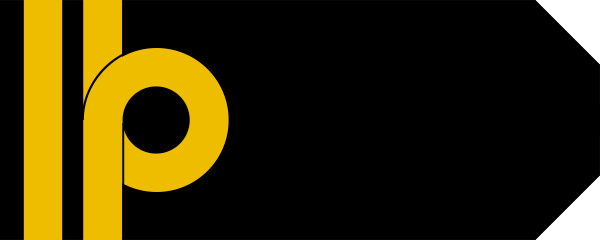
- Podporucznik marynarki (Midshipman) - 15 August 1932
- Porucznik marynarki (Sub-lieutenant) - 3 May 1935
- Kapitan marynarki (Lieutenant) - 3 May 1940
- Komandor podporucznik (Lieutenant commander) - 31 May 1944
- Komandor porucznik (Commander) - 1945
