= Aneta Stawiszyńska =

Aneta Katarzyna Stawiszyńska (born 1983) is a Polish historian, regionalist and doctor of humanities.

== Biography ==
Stawiszyńska was born in 1983 in Łódź, Poland. In 2007, she completed a master's degree in history at the Institute of History at the University of Łódź. In 2015, she obtained a doctoral degree on the basis of a dissertation on the history of Łódź during World War I, written under the supervision of prof. dr. hab. Kazimierz Badziak (reviewers: prof. Andrzej Felchner and prof. Marek Przeniosło).

Author of two books: Ruda Pabianicka. Echoes of the Past, Łódź 2009 (pp. 112) and Łódź in the years of World War I, Oświęcim 2016 (pp. 806) and dozens of scientific, popular and popular articles on the history of the Łódź region, with particular emphasis on Łódź and Ruda Pabianicka, published, among others, in the pages of "Chronicle of the City of Łódź" or "Ziemia Łódzka".

In 2015, A. Stawiszyńska received a scholarship for young scientists from the Marshal of the Lodz Region. In 2019, she became a laureate of the reportage competition: "Łódzkie - known and unknown" organized by the Provincial Public Library. Józef Piłsudski in Łódź for the work "The Book of the Upper Market Square". Nominated twice (2010 and 2017) for the "Złoty Exlibris" award by the Provincial Public Library. Józef Piłsudski in Łódź in the "Best Book about Łódź" category.

== Publications ==
=== Books ===
1. Ruda Pabianicka. Echa przeszłości, Łódź 2009, ss. 112.
2. Łódź w latach I wojny światowej, Oświęcim 2016, ss. 806.

=== Scientific articles ===
1. Gospodarcza i społeczna działalność rodziny Horaków do 1945 r., „Studia z Historii Społeczno-Gospodarczej XIX i XX wieku” 2009, T. VI, s. 220–235.
2. Życie codzienne mieszkańców Łodzi w czasie I wojny światowej, [w:] Operacja Łódzka. Zapomniany fakt I wojny światowej, pod red. J. Daszyńskiej, Łódź 2011, s. 105–116.
3. Bitwa łódzka okiem łodzianina i literata. Aus unvergesslichen Tagen. Tagebuchaufzeichnungen Heinricha Zimmermanna, „Niemcy-Austria-Szwajcaria” 2012, T. 5, s. 87–107.
4. Życie literackie Łodzi w czasie I wojny światowej, „Acta Universitatis Lodziensis. Folia Litteraria Polonica” 2012, T. XVII, s. 67–84.
5. „Po co wracacie caratu sługi?...”. Łódź u progu niepodległości w poezji ówczesnych mieszkańców miasta, „Literaturoznawstwo” 2012–2013, T. VI, s. 209–219.
6. Wiejska okolica Łodzi czasów Wielkiej Wojny w publicystyce Theodora Abla i Heinriha Zimmermanna, „Zeszyty Wiejskie” 2013, T. XVIII, s. 312–322.
7. Działalność Łódzkiej Ochotniczej Straży Ogniowej w czasie I wojny światowej, „Historyczny Rocznik Pożarniczy” 2013, nr 1.
8. Świat łódzkiej farmacji w latach I wojny światowej, „Farmacja Polska” 2013, nr 12 (69), s. 707–713.
9. Problemy wychowawcze w łódzkich szkołach średnich w czasie I wojny światowej. Wybrane zagadnienia, „Kultura i Wychowanie” 2013, nr 6, s. 30–37.
10. Łódzka Orkiestra Symfoniczna czasów Wielkiej Wojny w recenzjach Feliksa Helperna, „Acta Universitatis Lodziensis. Folia Litteraria Polonica” 2013, T. XX, s. 57–73.
11. Działalność tanich kuchni i herbaciarni w Łodzi w latach I wojny światowej, „Piotrkowskie Zeszyty Historyczne” 2013, T. XIV, s. 91–116.
12. Losy łodzian w czasie I wojny światowej (1914-1918) na przykładzie rodzeństwa Antoniny, Feliksa i Stanisława Tomczak-Tomaszewskich, „Muzealny Rocznik Historyczny” 2013, T. II, s. 7–21.
13. Okolice Łodzi jako cel turystyki łodzian w czasie I wojny światowej, „Vade Nobiscum” 2013, T. IX, s. 265–270.
14. Cukiernie jako element życia codziennego łódzkich elit w czasie I wojny światowej, „Vade Nobiscum” 2013, T. XI, s. 185–192.
15. Zagonki jako forma pomocy mieszkańcom Łodzi w czasie I wojny światowej, „Acta Universitatis Lodzensis. Folia Historica” 2013, T. XC, s. 75–86.
16. Konrad Fiedler i jego działalność na rzecz popularyzowania turystyki i krajoznawstwa w Łodzi w latach I wojny światowej, „Zeszyty Naukowe Wyższej Szkoły Turystyki i Języków Obcych. Turystyka i Rekreacja” 2014, T. XII, s. 191–199.
17. Pobyt i działalność Gustawa Daniłowskiego w Łodzi w październiku 1914 r., „Przegląd Humanistyczny” 2014, R. LVIII, nr 4, s. 121–128.
18. Starty wojenne poniesione przez księgarnię L. Fiszera w Łodzi w latach Wielkiej Wojny w świetle akt Komisji Szacunkowej Miejscowej, „Toruńskie Studia Bibliologiczne” 2014, T. XII, s. 31–42.
19. Praca dziennikarska i społeczna Bolesława Busiakiewicza w Łodzi w latach 1916–1918, „Zeszyty Prasoznawcze” 2014, T. LVII, z. 4 (220), s. 749–759.
20. Realia życia dzieci łódzkich w czasie Wielkiej Wojny. Wybrane zagadnienia, „Kultura i Wychowanie” 2014, T. VIII, s. 51–58
21. Reklamy leków i parafarmaceutyków w gazetach łódzkich w czasie I wojny światowej, „Bez Recepty” 2014, nr 2, s. 4.
22. Problemy opałowe Łodzi w latach I wojny światowej, „Studia z Historii Społeczno-Gospodarczej XIX i XX wieku” 2014, T. XII, s. 73–86.
23. Łódzka zieleń w cieniu Wielkiej Wojny, „Acta Universatis Lodziensis. Folia Historica” 2014, T. XCII, s. 65–81.
24. Walka ze zjawiskiem prostytucji i jej konsekwencjami w Łodzi w latach Wielkiej Wojny, „Piotrkowskie Zeszyty Historyczne” 2014, T. XV, s. 117–135.
25. Społeczność łódzkich esperantystów w latach Wielkiej Wojny, „Studia z Historii Społeczno-Gospodarczej XIX i XX wieku” 2014, T. XIII, s. 113–126.
26. Lodzermensche z oblężonego miasta – łodzianie na łamach pamiętnika Cezarego Jellenty „Wielki zmierzch”, „Acta Universitatis Lodziensis. Folia Historica” 2014, T. XCIII, s. 53–61.
27. Lodzincy w naciale Wielkoi Wojny, [w:] Niezabytoje sriażienie 1914 goda Lodz prifrontwoi gorod, pod red. G. F. Matveeva, Moskwa 2014, s. 81–108.
28. Działalność społeczna, medyczna i artystyczna Lazara Prybulskiego, „Kronika miasta Łodzi” 2014, nr 3, s. 124–130.
29. Działalność Muzeum Nauki i Sztuki w Łodzi w latach I wojny światowej, „Zeszyty Naukowe Wyższej Szkoły Turystyki i Języków Obcych w Warszawie. Turystyka i Rekreacja” 2015, s. 111–122.
30. Garderoba ubogich Łodzian w czasie I wojny światowej, „Kwartalnik Historii Kultury Materialnej” 2015, nr 1, s. 67–77.
31. Kim była Lidia Gablerówna?, „Kronika miasta Łodzi” 2015, s. 118–124.
32. Kultura fizyczna w Łodzi w latach Wielkiej Wojny. Działalność Władysława Pytlasińskiego na rzecz upowszechniania kultury fizycznej w Łodzi w latach Wielkiej Wojny, „Kronika miasta Łodzi” 2015, s. 103–112.
33. Moralne aspekty dobroczynności łódzkiej w czasie I wojny światowej. Wybrane spory wokół form pomocy ubogim, „Rocznik Łódzki” 2015, T. LXIII, s. 65–80.
34. Przypominamy Gustawa Horaka. Muzyk, przedsiębiorca, społecznik, „Kronika miasta Łodzi” 2015, nr 3, s. 125–133.
35. Działalność Milicji Obywatelskiej w Łodzi ( sierpień 1914 – lipiec 1915 r.), „Acta Universitatis Lodziensis. Folia Historica” 2015, T. XCIV, s. 109–132.
36. Podłódzki Karlsbad czy letnisko dla mało wymagających? Ruda Pabianicka jako miejsce wypoczynku łodzian w latach I wojny światowej, [w:] Nieznane historie Łodzi z czasów Wielkiej Wojny, pod red. J. A. Daszyńskiej, Łódź 2016, s. 94–112.
37. Mateusz Bensman i jego działalność artystyczna w Łodzi na początku XX wieku, „Piotrkowskie Zeszyty Historyczne” 2016, T. XVII, s. 63–76.
38. Duchowny wobec wyzwań Wielkiej Wojny. Działalność religijna i społeczna ks. Kanonika Wacława Wyrzykowskiego (1876-1935) w Łodzi w czasie I wojny światowej, „Kronika miasta Łodzi” 2016, nr 1, s. 145–152.
39. Jerzy Żuławski i jego działalność w Łodzi w październiku 1914 r., „Acta Universitatis Lodziensis. Folia Historica” 2015, T. XCIV, s. 111–124.
40. Odczyty jako forma działalności łódzkiego oddziału PTK w latach I wojny światowej, „Zeszyty Naukowe Wyższej Szkoły Turystyki i Języków Obcych w Warszawie: Turystyka i Rekreacja” 2016, T. XVII, s. 121–131.
41. Robert Guse – zapomniany fabrykant, „Kronika miasta Łodzi” 2017, nr 1, s. 135–139.
42. Szkolnictwo osób niesłyszących w Łodzi w czasie I wojny światowej, „Piotrkowskie Zeszyty Historyczne”, 2017, T. 18, s. 37–48.
43. Strajk tramwajarzy łódzkich w marcu 1917 roku, „Rocznik Łódzki” 2017, T. 67, s. 91–106.
44. Brak mydła jako problem dnia codziennego mieszkańców Łodzi w czasie I wojny światowej, „Acta Universitatis Lodziensis. Folia Historica” 2017, T. 98, s. 101–116.
45. Nie tylko „Czarna Mańka”. Twórczość i zaangażowanie Czesława Gumkowskiego wobec wyzwań łódzkich realiów Wielkiej Wojny, „Toruńskie Studia Bibliologiczne” 2018, T. 20, s. 117–139.
46. Działalność Związku Młodzieży Polskiej Pochodzenia Żydowskiego „Żagiew” w Łodzi w latach I wojny światowej (1914-1918), „Kultura i Wychowanie” 2018, T. 14, nr 2, s. 9–24.
47. Działalność gospodarcza rodziny Baierów w Łodzi i Rudzie Pabianickiej do 1945 r., „Rocznik Łódzki” 2018, T. LXVIII, s. 135–146.
48. Teofil Abraham Tugendhold. Szekspirolog w aptekarskim kitlu, „Kronika miasta Łodzi” 2019, nr 3, s. 156–166.
49. Miasto Ruda Pabianicka we wspomnieniach mieszkańców (1923-1946), „Rocznik Łódzki” 2019, T. 69, s. 109–129.
50. Zorganizowane wyjazdy na wieś jako forma pomocy dzieciom łódzkim w latach I wojny światowej, „Zeszyty Wiejskie” 2019, T. 25, s. 53–68.
51. Życie codzienne wojsk niemieckich stacjonujących w Łodzi w czasie I wojny światowej (1914-1918), [w:] Łódzkie drogi do niepodległości 1905–1918, pod red. J. Żelazko, Łódź 2020, s. 75–98.
52. Pierwsza polska Farbiarnia i Wykańczalnia Jedwabiu Artura Meistra – zarys dziejów do 1945 r., „Rocznik Łódzki” 2020, T. LXX, s. 171–187.
53. Działalność Towarzystwa Wydawniczego „Kompas” w Łodzi do 1939 r., „Toruńskie Studia Bibliograficzne” 2020, V. 13, Nr 2 (25), s. 77–91.
54. Łódzka stomatologia w okresie I wojny światowej (1914–1918), „Acta Universitatis Lodziensis. Folia Historica” 2020, T. 106, s. 77–87
55. Działalność gospodarcza rodziny Muellerów w Rudzie Pabianickiej do 1945 r., „Rocznik Łódzki” 2021, T. LXXI, s. 113–128. [co-author: Jarosław Dolat].
56. Życie i działalność Ludwika i Heleny Stolarzewiczów na tle życia literackiego i naukowego Łodzi w okresie międzywojennym, „Przegląd Archiwalno-Historyczny" 2021, T. VIII, s. 55–77.
57. „Głos Rudy Pabianickiej” i jego rola w kształtowaniu poczucia tożsamości mieszkańców miasta Rudy Pabianickiej, „Rocznik Łódzki” 2022, T. LXXII, s. 107–120.

=== Development and editing of source materials ===
1. Korespondencja rodzeństwa Antoniny, Feliksa, Jana i Stanisława Tomczak-Tomaszewskich z lat I wojny światowej, Łódź 2015.
2. A. Krzewiński, Czytelnictwo w Łodzi, [w:] „Budzi się Łódź...” Obraz miasta – między literaturą a publicystyką. Antologia cz. II, pod red. M. Kucner, A. Wardy i K. Kołodziej, Łódź 2021, s. 212–213.
3. G. Bolkowska, Muzeum łódzkie, [w:] „Budzi się Łódź...” Obraz miasta – między literaturą a publicystyką. Antologia cz. II, pod red. M. Kucner, A. Wardy i K. Kołodziej, Łódź 2021, s. 209–211.
4. S. Świderski, Rudzianin, [w:] „Budzi się Łódź...” Obraz miasta – między literaturą a publicystyką. Antologia cz. II, pod red. M. Kucner, A. Wardy i K. Kołodziej, Łódź 2021, s. 567–569.
5. Cz. Gumkowski, Prawdziwe oblicze Łodzi, [w:] „Budzi się Łódź...” Obraz miasta – między literaturą a publicystyką. Antologia cz. II, pod red. M. Kucner, A. Wardy i K. Kołodziej, Łódź 2021, s. 494–495.

=== Popular science articles ===
1. Nieszczęsny dar władzy według Steinbecka, „Kurier Instytutu Historii” 2005 nr 2, s. 6–7.
2. Melchior Wańkowicz. Pierwszy polski copywriter, „Kurier Instytutu Historii” 2006 nr 4, s. 10.
3. Promieniotwórczość, Skłodowska i skandal, „Kurier Instytutu Historii” 2006 nr 9, s. 8.
4. Pamiętna ucieczka, „Stosunki Międzynarodowe” 2007, nr 48–49, s. 36–37.
5. Tyle słońca w całym mieście... Rzecz o działalności „Kółka Miłośników Feba”, „Ziemia Łódzka” 2012, nr 12, s. 20.
6. To była orkiestra!, „Ziemia Łódzka” 2013, nr 1, s. 4–5.
7. Pochwała królika, „Ziemia Łódzka” 2013, nr 3, s. 21.
8. Zamach na Horaka, „Ziemia Łódzka” 2013, nr 4. s. 12–13.
9. Wojenne wakacje, „Ziemia Łódzka” 2013, nr 7–8, s. 21.
10. Smutki nastoletniej duszy. Młodzieńcze wiersze Ireny Tuwim, „Ziemia Łódzka” 2013, nr 7–8, s. 19.
11. Marketing w starym kinie, „Ziemia Łódzka” 2013, nr 12, s. 20.
12. Jak prababcia herbaciarnią zarządzała, „Ziemia Łódzka” 2014, nr 1, s. 21.
13. Higieniczne obyczaje, „Ziemia Łódzka” 2014, nr 3, s. 22.
14. Karol Gaertner. Farmaceuta. Fotograf. Pasjonat, „Bez Recepty” 2014, nr 6, s. 22–23.
15. Konie łódzkie w latach I wojny światowej, „Hodowca i jeździec” 2014, nr 2, s. 127–129.
16. Kaliski zwiastun wojny, „Ziemia Łódzka” 2014, nr 7, s. 20.
17. Kulturalna operacja łódzka, „Kalejdoskop” 2014, nr 12, s. 42–46.
18. Społecznik czasów Wielkiej Wojny – Wiktor Groszkowski, „Bez Recepty” 2014, nr 11, s. 24–25.
19. Wielbiciele Sienkiewicza, „Ziemia Łódzka” 2014, nr 11, s. 19.
20. Władysław Makarczyk. Ziemianin w służbie ubogiego miasta, „Na Sieradzkich Szlakach” 2015, nr 1, s. 48–49.
21. Orkiestra na ciężkie czasy, „Kalejdoskop” 2015, nr 2, s. 18–20.
22. Rabunek w księgarni, „Ziemia Łódzka” 2015, nr 10, s. 19.
23. Inne pokolenie..., „Ziemia Łódzka” 2015, nr 11, s. 19.
24. Legionowy poeta w łódzkiej rzeczywistości, „Ziemia Łódzka” 2017, nr 10, s. 6.
25. Podzielona niepodległość, „Ziemia Łódzka” 2017, nr 12, s. 21.
26. Łódzkie dies irae, „Ziemia Łódzka” 2018, nr 1, s. 9.
27. Orkiestra pod obstrzałem... krytyka, „Ziemia Łódzka” 2018, nr 2, s. 6.
28. Ech, ta ówczesna młodzież..., „Ziemia Łódzka” 2018, nr 3, s. 5.
29. Rekordowa frekwencja, „Ziemia Łódzka” 2018, nr 4, s. 6.
30. W Europie nadal wojna..., „Ziemia Łódzka” 2018, nr 5, s. 6.
31. Z dala od frontu, „Ziemia Łódzka” 2018, nr 6, s. 4–5.
32. Monumentalny konkurs, „Ziemia Łódzka” 2018, nr 9, s. 6.
33. Irena Solska. Młodopolska muza w strzeleckim mundurze, publikacja: „Histmag”
34. Ulica Heinricha Zimmermanna, „Ziemia Łódzka” 2018, nr 10, s. 6.
35. Walka na różnych polach, „Ziemia Łódzka” 2018, nr 11, s. 15–16.
36. Czas wolny, „Ziemia Łódzka” 2018, nr 12, s. 18.
37. Gadzinówka „Godzina Polski”, czyli „pramatka gadzina”, publikacja: „Histmag”.
38. Zapomniani ojcowie „Czernej Mańki”, „Kalejdoskop” 2021, nr 4, s. 72.

=== Reviews ===
1. Y. Huang, Nierozłączni. Słynni syjamscy bracia i ich spotkanie z amerykańska historią, Poznań 2019, ss. 430, publikacja: „Histmag”.
2. W. Romer, (Na)dzieje 1939–2019, Warsaw 2019, ss. 352, publikacja: „Histmag”.
3. J. Sosnowska, Opieka nad dziećmi w Łodzi w latach I wojny światowej, Wydawnictwo Uniwersytetu Łódzkiego, Łódź 2017, ss. 497, „Przegląd Archiwalno-Historyczny” 2019, T. 6, s. 241–245.
4. Łódź i łodzianie wobec wojny polsko-bolszewickiej 1920 roku, pod red. W. Jarno i P. Waingertnera, Łódź 2020, ss. 310, publikacja: „Histmag”.
5. K. Śmiechowski, Kwestie miejskie. Dyskusja o problemach i przyszłości miast w Królestwie Polskim 1905–1915, Łódź 2020, ss. 298, publikacja: Histmag

=== Maps ===
1. Działania wojenne w okolicach Łodzi – Bitwa Łódzka (1914 r.), zniszczenia, cmentarze wojenne, [w:] Atlas historyczny miasta Łodzi, Łódź 2020.
2. Łódź pod okupacją niemiecką w nowych granicach z 1915 r., [w:] Atlas historyczny miasta Łodzi, Łódź 2020.
3. Plan miasta Ruda Pabianicka, [w:] Atlas historyczny miasta Łodzi, Łódź 2020.

=== Polemics ===
1. Odnośnie artykułu Katarzyny Kuczyńskiej-Koschany „Panienka, Godzina Polski, 1916: Irena Tuwim’s Literary Debut”, „Czytanie Literatury. Łódzkie Studia Literaturoznawcze” 2020, nr 9, s. 375–377.
