= ORP Żbik =

Two ships of the Polish Navy have been named ORP Żbik:

- ORP Żbik (1930), a Wilk-class submarine launched in 1930 and scrapped in 1956
- ORP Żbik (1959), a minesweeper launched in 1959 and decommissioned in 1989
