= Wrzesień żagwiący =

- Cover of collected works featuring Wrzesień żagwiący, 2009
- Author: Melchior Wańkowicz
- Language: Polish
- Subject: Invasion of Poland
- Genre: History
- Publisher: Prószyński i S-ka
- Publication date: 2009
- Publication place: Poland
- Media type: Re-Print
- Pages: 656
- ISBN: 8376482009
- OCLC: 489549587

Wrzesień żagwiący (English: Scorching September) is a 1947 book of literary reportage written by the Polish historian and political journalist Melchior Wańkowicz. The book is a collection of analytical thinking stories written by Wańkowicz in the early 1940s, while the author was in exile. Following the invasion of Poland, he left the country in late September 1939 for Romania, later moving to Cyprus, BritishPalestine, Italy, and finally, to London. Wrzesień żagwiący gives a vivid account of the Polish September Campaign; its title refers to the fact that Nazi Germany, together with the Soviet Union invaded the Second Polish Republic jointly in September 1939. The book was first published in 1947, in London, by Gryf Publishing House. It was reprinted in 1990 by Polonia Publishing House, while several stories from the book were printed separately, with the most popular one, Westerplatte, having been printed in 1959, 1960, 1963, 1967, 1968, 1971, 1989, and 1990. In August 2009, Warsaw publishing house Prószyński i Spółka reprinted the book in the third volume of collected works by Wańkowicz. In this volume, Wrzesień żagwiący is published together with other war-related stories, such as Strzępy epopei, Szpital w Cichiniczach, and Po klęsce.

The introduction to the 2009 volume was written by Tadeusz Paweł Rutkowski, historian of the University of Warsaw. Rutkowski wrote that Wańkowicz collected stories of the September Campaign "on the spot, planning to publish them in the press (...) After crossing the Romanian border, he faced a general chaos and bitterness of the lost war. For the Polish nation, the speed of German units, their advancement in armour and airforce, and the panic evacuation of Polish authorities, were a complete shock (...) Wrzesień żagwiący was written to present heroism of the Polish soldier, and to show the world that the invasion was not an easy walk for the Germans. Polish troops were eager to fight, but were defeated by numerical and technological superiority of the enemy (...) New stories were added to the book throughout the war. Wrzesień... is full of emotions, not always factually accurate and spiked with statistical errors, yet authentic and direct (...) Wańkowicz presents people who kept on fighting aware of hopelessness of their position. He describes the country which was attacked by two enemies, with soldiers trying to reach southern border, between the Wehrmacht in the west, and the Red Army in the east. The detailed description of fighting sometimes is far from reality, which was the result of Wańkowicz's inability to confront stories told by different people. Therefore, the description of the Battle of Westerplatte, based mainly on the account of Mayor Henryk Sucharski, diverges from historical works (...) It is a paradox that the book, written for immediate publication as an answer to German propaganda, did not accomplish its task. Its author, banned by the government of Władysław Sikorski for his pre-war affiliations, did not receive permission for the publication. As a complete book, it was not published until 1947, reaching a narrow circle of readers. In the People's Republic of Poland, Wrzesień żagwiący was never published in its complete form. Communist censorship accepted the chapters about Westerplatte and Major Dobrzański, but descriptions of Soviet invasion and fighting with the Red Army were not available for Polish readers until 1990".

== Publication history ==
Wrzesień żagwiący was based on the author's 1943 collection of reportages, published in British Palestine in 1943 during the Mediterranean Campaign. It was titled Wrześniowym szlakiem. Wańkowicz wrote it under pen name Jerzy Łużyc. In 1947, after coming to London, Wańkowicz expanded Wrześniowym szlakiem, adding new stories, and changing the name of the publication into Wrzesień żagwiący. As the author claimed, most of his reportages had been written in the final months of 1939, and were based on personal interviews with soldiers of the Polish Army and Polish civil servants, who witnessed or fought in the Invasion of Poland. Due to his work, the defenders of Westerplatte, and Major Henryk Dobrzański became legendary figures in Polish historiography. Nevertheless, Wrzesień żagwiący should not be considered a history books, as in some cases Wańkowicz's interlocutors did not give truthful testimonies. Among others, in August 1946 in Italy, Wańkowicz interviewed Major Henryk Sucharski, who did not mention the fact that in the first days of the Battle of Westerplatte, he suffered a nervous breakdown, and the defence was commanded by Captain Franciszek Dąbrowski.

In the 1947 foreword, Wańkowicz writes: "Most of this book was written in 1939, to give testimony to our fighting. At that time, everything that the world knew about September, came from our enemies, who spread lies about the campaign that lasted only for eighteen days. The world wondered why small Finland defended itself for so long. That is why I wrote the book in a hurry, without sources, with one target - to show Polish fighting spirit. So, my book is not a report about the war itself, but rather about Polish spirit in September 1939 (...) Loose pages wandered with me across the world, and when in 1943 I finally had the chance to publish the stories, several were missing (...) Currently, when so many people from oflags, gulags and Poland joined us, the need for re-publishing the book for Poles in England has arisen. I am adding Westerplatte, the story of General Tadeusz Kutrzeba's airforce, and the story of Major Hubal."

== Chapters ==
=== Dywersja niemiecka w Polsce (German Subversion in Poland) ===
The activities of the pro-German fifth column began in the Second Polish Republic right after World War I. Several German organizations operated in the 1920s and 1930s, including the Deutsche Arbeitspartei, the Jugendbund, and the Volks Bund, headed by Hans Glodny, a man who had a Polish father and a German mother. Following the Great Crisis, unemployment in Poland was widespread, especially in Polish part of Upper Silesia, whose mines produced more coal than Poland needed. German propaganda took advantage of this, telling Silesians that Polish rule took away their jobs, and promising that after the return of Upper Silesia to Germany, new posts would be created.

- Okres "przyjaźni" polsko-niemieckiej (The Period of Polish-German "Friendship")

Following the 1934 German–Polish Non-Aggression Pact, several legal German associations were opened in Poland, such as the Jungdeutsche Partei, created by engineer Wiesner from Bielsko-Biała. Upon orders of Rudolf Hess, military sabotage was under preparation, with members of the German minority being sent to the Third Reich for training. Meanwhile, Hitler reduces unemployment, and German enterprises need workers. Polish citizens are often employed, but on the condition that they join German organizations, and their children attend German schools. Training for saboteurs is organized in the town of Leobschutz, where participants learn how to use guns and grenades.

- Tuż przed wojną (Right Before the War)
- Wybuch wojny (The Outbreak of War)

=== Pierwsze trzy dni wojny w Gdańsku (First Three Days of War in Gdańsk) ===
- Zostają (They Are Staying)
- "Goście" przechodzą przez most (The "Guests" are Crossing the Bridge)
- Immunitet (Immunity)
- Zemsta (The Revenge)
- Tortury I morderstwa (Tortures and Murders)
- Wyzwolenie (Release)

=== Te pierwsze walki (The First Fights) ===
- Pierwsze czołgi (First Tanks)
- Pierwsza gorycz (First Bitterness)
- W opałach (In Trouble)
- Obrona mostu (Defence of a Bridge)

=== Dzieje kompanii saperskiej (The History of a Company of Sappers) ===
- Jeszcze stawiam pod karabin (I am Still Standing by a Gun)
- Masakra w lesie (A Massacre in a Forest)
- Białe rękawiczki (White Gloves)
- Jak zając w kotle (Like a Hare in a Cauldron)
- Ponoć nasi biją w tarabany (Apparently, Our Boys are Beating the Drums)
- Odwet niemiecki (German Retaliation)
- Cmentarzysko broni (A Cemetery of Weapons)

=== Jędrek, Witek, i ich tysiące (Jędrek, Witek, and the Thousands of Them) ===
- Opowiadanie Witka (Witek's Story)
- Walka pod Kamionką Strumiłową (The Battle of Kamionka Strumiłowa)
- Hej! Gdzie to walczą jeszcze? (Hey! Are They Still Fighting Somewhere?)
- W armii generała Kleeberga (In General Kleeberg's Army)
- Ziemia zwraca broń (The Soil is Returning the Weapons)
- Ucieczka z niewoli (Escape from Captivity)
- Znowu przed Bolszewikami (Again Fighting the Bolsheviks)
- Dziecko! (A Child!)

=== Walka o polskie niebo (The Struggle for the Polish Sky) ===
- Ogólne dane (General Data)
- Brygada obrony Warszawy (The Brigade Defending Warsaw)
- Lotnictwo w armii generała Bortnowskiego (The Airforce in the Army of General Bortnowski)
- Lotnictwo w armii generała Kutrzeby (The Airforce in the Army of General Kutrzeba)
- Lotnictwo w armii generała Szylinga (The Airforce in the Army of General Szyling)
- Dzieje dywizjonu karasi (The history of a Unit of PZL .23 Karaś)

=== Z generałem Sosnkowskim (With General Sosnkowski) ===
- Dywizja Jeż (The Jeż Division)
- Generał Sosnkowski obejmuje komendę (General Sosnkowski Takes the Command)
- Z odsieczą dla Lwowa (With Relief for Lwów)
- Pogrom Niemców pod Jaworowem (The Defeat of Germans at Jaworów)
- Boje pod Janowem (Fighting Near Janów)
- Przebicie się 11. Dywizji na Brzuchowice (The Breakthrough of the 11th Division to Brzuchowice)
- Bój pod Brzuchowicami (The Battle of Brzuchowice)
- Jak w 1863 roku (Like in the year 1863)

=== Z generałem Andersem (With General Anders) ===
- Patrząc z Iraku wstecz (Looking Back from Iraq)
- Pierwsze dni wojny (The First Days of War)
- W Płocku (In Płock)
- Marsz na Warszawę (The March Towards Warsaw)
- Natarcie na Mińsk Mazowiecki (The Attack on Mińsk Mazowiecki)
- I znowu pięknie zorganizowana grupa (And Again the Group is Finely Organized)
- Przebicie się na Suchowolę (The Breakthrough to Suchowola)
- Walka o przeprawę (Fight for the River Crossing)
- Marsz między niemiecką I rosyjską armią (The March Between German and Soviet Armies)
- Rozgrom Niemców (The Sweep of Germans)
- Walki z nasuwającą się armią Tiuleniewa (Fighting the Advancing Army of Tulenev)
- Ostatnie chwile grupy generała Andersa (Final Moments of the Group of General Anders)
- Resztki 26. pułku ułanów I 9. DAK-u (The Remains of the 26th Uhlan Regiment)
- A co z resztką batalionu majora Peruckiego (And What With the Remains of Major Perucki's Battalion)
- Losy generała Andersa po wrześniu (The Fate of General Anders after September)

=== Hubalczycy (The Soldiers of Hubal) ===
- W nieznane (In the Unknown)
- Pierwsza utarczka pod Maciejowicami (First Skirmish at Maciejowice)
- Dwie walki w Górach Świętokrzyskich (Two Skirmishes in the Holy Cross Mountains)
- Będziemy pomostem między wrześniem I wiosną (We Will be a Bridge Between September and Spring)
- Opały w Cisowniku (The Trouble in Cisownik)
- Ułani werbują, strzelcy maszerują - zaciągnę się (The Uhlans are Recruiting, the Shooters are Marching - I Will Join)
- Willa I po willi (A villa destroyed)
- Szkolenie I... niesurbodynacja (Training and... Disobedience)
- Wielki bój pod Huciskami (The Great Battle of Huciska)
- Okrążenie pod Szałasami (The Encirclement at Szałasy)
- "Trędowaci" (The "Lepers")
- Śmierć Hubala (The Death of Hubal)
- Epilog (Epilogue)
