= ORP Sokół (1940) =

Polish submarine

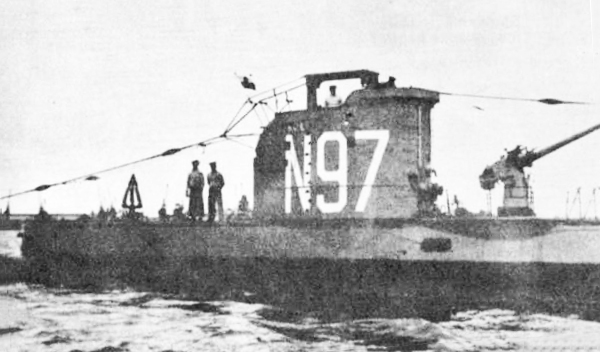
- Sokół as seen in Malta, possibly in 1943

History

United Kingdom
- Name: HMS Urchin
- Builder: Vickers-Armstrongs, Barrow-in-Furness
- Laid down: 9 December 1939
- Launched: 30 September 1940
- Identification: Pennant number: N97
- Fate: Transferred to Poland in January 1941
- Badge

Poland
- Name: ORP Sokół
- Commissioned: 19 January 1941
- Identification: Pennant number: N97
- Fate: Returned to Royal Navy 27 July 1945

United Kingdom
- Name: HMS Urchin
- Acquired: Transferred from Poland on 27 July 1945
- Recommissioned: 3 August 1946
- Decommissioned: December 1948
- Identification: Pennant number: N97
- Fate: Scrapped September 1949

General characteristics
- Class & type: U-class submarine
- Displacement: Surfaced - 540 tons standard, 630 tons full load; Submerged - 730 tons
- Length: 58.22 m (191.0 ft)
- Beam: 4.9 m (16 ft)
- Draught: 4.62 m (15.2 ft)
- Installed power: Diesel: 615 hp (459 kW); Electric: 825 hp (615 kW)
- Propulsion: 2 shaft diesel-electric; 2 Paxman Ricardo diesel generators + electric motors
- Speed: 11.25 knots (20.8 km/h) max surfaced; 10 knots (19 km/h) max submerged
- Complement: 27-31
- Armament: 4 × bow internal 21 inch (533 mm) torpedo tubes with 8 to 10 torpedoes; 1 × 3-inch (76 mm) gun

ORP Sokół (Polish: Falcon) was a U-class submarine (formerly HMS Urchin) built by Vickers-Armstrongs at Barrow-in-Furness. Shortly after launching in September 1940 she was to be commissioned by the Royal Navy as HMS Urchin, but instead was leased to the Polish Navy due to a lack of experienced submarine crews. A sister boat to Dzik, both boats operated in the Mediterranean from Malta, where they became known as the "Terrible Twins".

== Polish service ==
Shortly after her trials, the boat was handed to her Polish crew, in accordance with the Anglo-Polish military alliance and amendments of 18 November 1939 and 3 December 1940. On 19 January 1941 the Polish banner was raised and the boat, commanded by Commander Borys Karnicki, was moved to Portsmouth. There she spent half a year patrolling the Bay of Biscay off the French port of Brest. In September she was moved to Malta, where she was attached to the 10th Submarine Flotilla. She took part in the naval runs on the Italian ports of Taranto and Naples. She also escorted numerous convoys in the Mediterranean. On 28 October of that year, Sokół achieved her first victory by heavily damaging the Italian auxiliary cruiser Città di Palermo. On 2 November in the Gulf of Naples she sank the 2,469-ton transport ship Balilla, with her sister HMS Utmost. On 19 November of the same year, she forced the anti-submarine nets and entered the port of Navarino, where she damaged the Italian destroyer Aviere. She was attacked by Italian torpedo boats and destroyers, but all of the depth charges missed and Sokół managed to escape from the harbour, sinking an additional transport steamer (5,600 tons) with three torpedoes. On 12 February 1942 she boarded and then sank the Italian wooden merchant schooner Giuseppina (362 tons) in the Gulf of Gabes.

On 17 April while in the port of Malta, she was heavily damaged by a German air raid and was forced to return to the shipyard in Blyth to for repairs. By mid-1943 she had returned to the Mediterranean, where she continued to harass enemy shipment off the coasts of Italy, Northern Africa and in the Adriatic. On 12 September she rammed and sank the fishing vessel Meattini (36 tons). She took part in the allied blockade of the naval bases in Naples and Pula. Off the coast of the latter port, transferred by the Italians to Nazi Germany, Sokół sank a munitions transport (probably the 7,095-ton SS Eridania) and three days afterwards on 11 November the Italian schooner Argentina (64 tons). Between 4 November 1943 and 25 February 1944 she operated in the Aegean from the naval base in Beirut. Among the ships sunk in that period were two transport ships, four schooners and one cutter. In March 1944 both of the "Terrible Twins" left Malta for Great Britain where they were attached to the Dundee-based 9th submarine flotilla. After an additional four patrols off the coast of Norway, in the spring of 1945 she was designated as a training ship and was used by the Royal Air Force for training naval bomber pilots.

== Wartime tally ==
Altogether, during her wartime service Sokół sank or damaged 19 enemy vessels of about 55,000 tons in total. All of the commanding officers of the boat, (Lieutenant Commander Karnicki, Lieutenant Commander Koziołkowski and Captain Bernas) were awarded the Virtuti Militari. The full patrol records of the ORP Sokół are stored at the National Record Office, Kew, England.

== Royal Navy service ==
Returned to the Royal Navy on 27 July 1945 as HMS Urchin, she served for a further four years.

== Fate ==
Urchin was decommissioned in December 1948 and scrapped in September 1949.

== Bibliography ==
- Hutchinson, Robert (2001). Jane's submarines : war beneath the waves from 1776 to the present day. London: HarperCollins. ISBN 978-0007105588.
- Andrzej S. Bartelski. Tajemnice polskich Jolly Roger. „Morze, Statki i Okręty". 4/2009. ISSN 1426-529X
- Andrzej S. Bartelski. "Terrible Twins" - czyli polskie okręty podwodne na Morzu Śródziemnym. „Okręty Wojenne". 2/2001. ISSN 1231-014X
- Andrzej S. Bartelski, Rafał M. Kaczmarek. Polskiej wojny podwodnej ciąg dalszy. „Morze, Statki i Okręty". 4/2008. ISSN 1426-529X
- Wojciech Holicki. Okręty podwodne typu U i V. „Nowa Technika Wojskowa". 9/2000 i 10/2000. ISSN 1230-1655
- Jerzy Lipiński: Druga wojna światowa na morzu. Warszawa: 1995. ISBN 83-902554-7-2
- Rafał M. Kaczmarek. Polska wojna podwodna. „Morze, Statki i Okręty". 4/2004 i 6/2004. ISSN 1426-529X
- Jerzy Pertek: Mała flota wielka duchem. Poznań: 1989. ISBN 83-210-0697-3
- Stanisław M. Piaskowski: Okręty Rzeczypospolitej Polskiej 1920–1946. Warszawa: 1996. OCLC 243879167
- Jürgen Rohwer, Gerhard Hümmelchen: Chronik des Seekrieges 1939–1945
- Paweł Wieczorkiewicz. Polska Marynarka Wojenna w latach II wojny światowej. „Morze, Statki i Okręty". 3/1998. ISSN 1426-529X
