= SMS M85 =

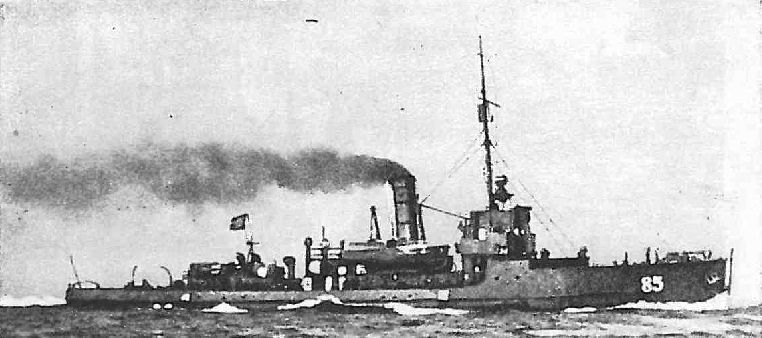
- M85 in Kriegsmarine service

History

German Empire
- Name: SMS M85
- Builder: Nordseewerke, Emden
- Yard number: 110
- Launched: 10 April 1918
- Commissioned: 3 August 1918

Germany (Weimar Republic)
- Name: M85

Nazi Germany
- Name: M85
- Fate: Sunk 1 October 1939

General characteristics
- Class & type: M1916 type minesweeper
- Displacement: 553 t (544 long tons) deep load
- Length: 59.30 m (194 ft 7 in) o/a
- Beam: 7.40 m (24 ft 3 in)
- Draught: 2.2–2.3 m (7 ft 3 in – 7 ft 7 in)
- Propulsion: 2 shaft reciprocating steam engines, 2 coal-fired boilers, 1,850 ihp (1,380 kW)
- Speed: 16 knots (30 km/h; 18 mph)
- Range: 2,000 nmi (3,700 km; 2,300 mi) at 14 kn (16 mph; 26 km/h)
- Complement: 40
- Armament: 8.8 cm (3.5 in) SK L/45 naval guns; 30 naval mines

SMS M85 (Note: "SMS" stands for "Seiner Majestät Schiff" (German: His Majesty's Ship)) was a M1916 type minesweeper built for the Imperial German Navy during the First World War by the Emden shipyard Nordseewerke, being launched on 10 April 1918 and entering service on 2 October that year. M85 survived the remainder of the war, and was passed on to the Reichsmarine, the navy of the Weimar Republic and then to the Nazi German Kriegsmarine. The outbreak of the Second World War saw M85 supporting the German invasion of Poland in September 1939, and she was sunk by a Polish mine on 1 October 1939 in one of the last acts of the Polish campaign.

== Design and construction ==
The M1916 Type minesweeper was an improved and slightly enlarged derivative of the M1914 and M1915 Type minesweepers which Germany had built since 1914. They were fleet minesweepers, seaworthy enough to operate in the open sea, and proved to be successful and reliable in service.

M85 was 59.30 m (194 ft 7 in) long overall and 56.00 m (183 ft 9 in) at the waterline, with a beam of 7.40 m (24 ft 3 in) and a draught of 2.2–2.3 m (7 ft 3 in – 7 ft 7 in). The ship had a design displacement of 515 t (507 long tons) and a deep load displacement of 553 t (544 long tons). Two coal-fired water-tube boilers fed steam to two sets of 3-cylinder triple expansion steam engines, rated at 1,850 ihp (1,380 kW), which in turn drove two propeller shafts. Speed was 16 kn (18 mph; 30 km/h). 120 tons of coal was carried, sufficient for a range of 2,000 nmi (2,300 mi; 3,700 km) at 14 kn (16 mph; 26 km/h).

As built, M85 had a main gun armament of two 8.8 cm (3.5 in) SK L/45 naval guns, (Note: SK stood for Schnellfeuerkanone (quick-firing gun).) while 30 mines could be carried. Post-war, most of the ships of the class were rearmed with a single 10.5 cm gun and three 2.0 cm anti-aircraft cannon. The ship had a crew of 40.

M85 was laid down at the shipbuilder Nordseewerke's Emden shipyard as yard number 110. She was launched on 10 April 1918 and entered service on 3 August 1918.

== Service ==
M85 survived the remaining three months of the First World War. While the majority of the ships of the Imperial German Navy were interned at Scapa Flow and were scuttled on 21 June 1919, the German Navy's minesweepers remained under its control, although disarmed, as they were needed to help clear the extensive minefields in the North and Baltic Seas. When the Weimar Republic established the Reichsmarine, with its size constrained by the terms of the Treaty of Versailles, M85 was one of the ships taken over by the new navy. In 1931, M85 was noted as being in reserve.

M85 had returned to active service by 1 September 1939, when the German invasion of Poland started the Second World War, with M85 forming part of the newly established 7th Minesweeping Flotilla. On 4 September 1939, together with sister ships M75 and M84 assisted the minelayer Brummer in laying a minefield at the southern end of the Øresund. The 7th Minesweeping Flotilla, including M85 was deployed to Polish waters on 5 September.

On 1 October 1939, shortly after the garrison of the Hel Peninsula had agreed to surrender, ending the Battle of Hel, M85 struck a mine north east of Jastarnia, which had been laid by the Polish submarine Żbik. 24 of M85's crew were killed, with the survivors rescued by the minesweeper M122 and several R boats. M85's crew were used to man two Polish minesweepers (Żuraw and Czajka) that had been captured intact at Hel.

== Bibliography ==
- Gardiner, Robert; Gray, Randal, eds. (1985). Conway's All The World's Fighting Ships 1906–1921. London: Conway Maritime Press. ISBN 0-85177-245-5.
- Gardiner, Robert; Chesneau, Roger, eds. (1980). Conway's All The World's Fighting Ships 1922–1946. London: Conway Maritime Press. ISBN 0-85177-146-7.
- Gröner, Erich; Jung, Dieter; Maass, Martin (1983). Die deutschen Kriegsschiffe 1815–1945: Band 2: Torpedoboote, Zerstörer, Schnellboote, Minensuchboote, Minenräumboote [German warships 1815–1945: Torpedo boats, Destroyers, Speedboats, Minesweepers, Minesweeper Boats] (in German). Vol. II. Koblenz: Bernard & Graef Verlag. ISBN 3-7637-4801-6.
- Haarr, Geirr H. (2013). The Gathering Storm: The Naval War in Northern Europe: September 1939 – April 1940. Barnsley, UK: Seaforth. ISBN 978-1-84832-140-3.
- Lenton, H. T. (1975). German Warships of the Second World War. London: Macdonald and Jane's. ISBN 0-356-04661-3.
- Parkes, Oscar, ed. (1973) [1931]. Jane's Fighting Ships 1931 (repr. David & Charles ed.). Sampson Low, Marston. ISBN 0-7153-5849-9.
- Paterson, Lawrence (2017). Hitler's Forgotten Flotillas: Kriegsmarine Security Flotillas. Barnsley, UK: Seaforth Publishing. ISBN 978-1-4738-8239-3.
- Rohwer, Jürgen; Hümmelchen, Gerhard (1992). Chronology of the War At Sea 1939–1945. London: Greenhill Books. ISBN 1-85367-117-7.
