= Melchior Wańkowicz =

Polish army officer, writer, political journalist and publisher

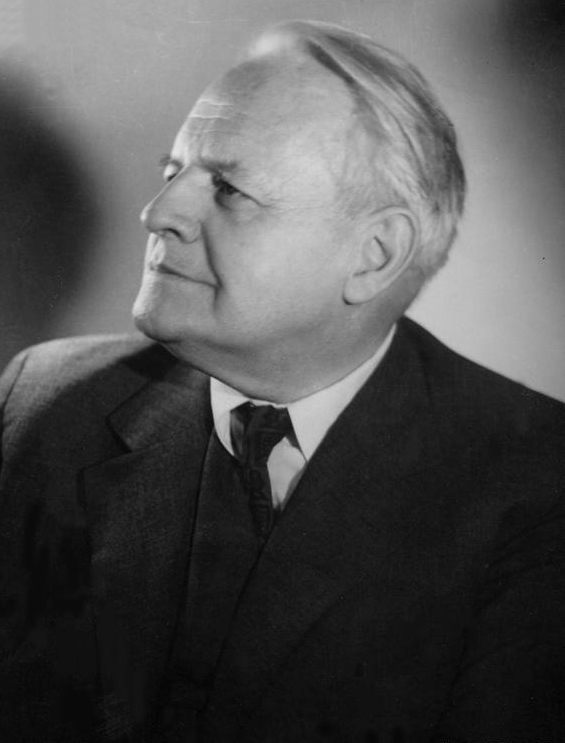
- Wańkowicz before 1950
- Born: 10 January 1892; Kalużyce, Minsk Governorate, Russian Empire
- Died: 10 September 1974 (aged 82); Warsaw, Poland
- Occupations: Novelist, essayist, memorist
- Writing career
- Language: Polish
- Genres: Biographies, memoirs, World War II history, personal correspondence
- Notable works: Bitwa o Monte Cassino (1947); Karafka La Fontaine'a (1972); Sztafeta (1939); Wrzesień żagwiący (1947)
- Literary movement: Modernism

Melchior Wańkowicz (10 January 1892 – 10 September 1974) was a Polish army officer, popular writer, political journalist and publisher. He is most famous for his reporting for the Polish Armed Forces in the West during World War II and writing a book about the battle of Monte Cassino.

== Biography ==
Melchior Wańkowicz was born on 10 January 1892 in Kalużyce in the Minsk Governorate of the Russian Empire, now Kolyuzhitsa, Byerazino Raion, Minsk Region, Belarus. He attended school in Warsaw, then the Jagiellonian University in Kraków, which he graduated from in 1922. An activist in the Polish independence movement, he was an officer in the Riflemen Union (Związek Strzelecki). During the First World War he fought in the Polish I Corps in Russia under General Józef Dowbor-Muśnicki.

After the war he worked as a journalist, for a time working as a chief of the press department in the Polish Ministry of Internal Affairs. In 1926 he founded a publishing agency, "Rój". He also worked in the advertising business, coining a popular slogan for the product advertisement of sugar – "cukier krzepi" (Sugar Invigorates). He wrote three books during the interwar period, all of them gaining him increasing fame and popularity. A few decades later he coined another famous slogan – "LOTem bliżej" ("closer with LOT"), advertising the Polish LOT airlines.

After the German invasion of Poland he lived for a while in Romania, where he wrote about the events of the Polish September. Later, from 1943 to 1946 he undertook what would be perhaps his most famous endeavour – he became a war correspondent for the Polish Armed Forces in the West. Later he wrote an account of the battle of Monte Cassino, his most famous book. One of his daughters, Krystyna Wańkowicz, died as a member of Polish resistance Armia Krajowa during the Warsaw Uprising in 1944.

From 1949 to 1958 he lived in the United States, afterwards returning to communist Poland. He opposed the communist regime, writing and lecturing about the Polish Forces in the West (whose participation was minimized by the government, which tried to emphasize the role of the Soviet-aligned Berling Army). His most known work is a three tome book about the battle of Monte Cassino, a tribute to the soldiers of the Anders Army – a book that was published in Poland only in a shortened, censored form (until the fall of communism in 1990).

After he cosigned the letter of 34 in 1964, protesting against the censorship, he was repressed by the government – the publication of his works was prohibited, and he was himself arrested, charged with slander of Poland and "spreading anti-Polish propaganda abroad" (partially due to the publication of some of his works by Radio Free Europe, but the chief evidence was a private letter to his daughter living in the USA) and sentenced to three years of imprisonment. However the sentence was never executed, and he was rehabilitated in 1990, after the fall of communism in Poland.

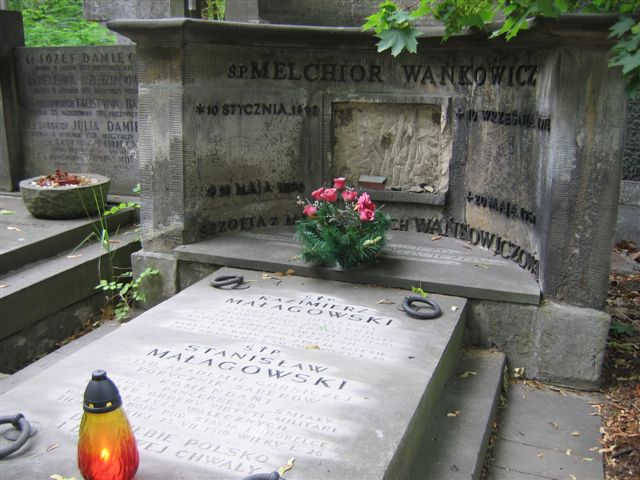
Melchior Wańkowicz's grave at the Powązki Cemetery in Warsaw

Wańkowicz died on 10 September 1974 in Warsaw.

== Works ==
- Anoda-katoda
- Bitwa o Monte Cassino (t. 1–3 1945–47)
- C.O.P – ognisko siły (1938)
- Czerwień i Amarant
- De profundis
- Drogą do Urzędowa (1955)
- Dwie prawdy (połączone w jednym wydaniu dwie rzeczy: "Hubalczycy" i "Westerplatte")
- Dzieje rodziny Korzeniewskich
- Hubalczycy (1959)
- Karafka La Fontaine'a (t. 1 1972, t. 2 pośm. 1980)
- Kaźń Mikołaja II
- Klub trzeciego miejsca (1949)
- Kundlizm (1947)
- Monte Cassino (skróc. wyd. krajowe Bitwy o Monte Cassino, 1957)
- Na tropach Smętka (1936)
- Od Stołpców po Kair (1969)
- Opierzona rewolucja (1934)
- Polacy i Ameryka
- Prosto od krowy (1965)
- Przez cztery klimaty 1912–1972 (1972)
- Reportaże zagraniczne
- Strzępy epopei
- Szczenięce lata (1934)
- Szkice spod Monte Cassino (1969)
- Szpital w Cichiniczach (1925)
- Sztafeta (1939)
- Tędy i owędy (1961)
- Tworzywo (Nowy Jork 1954, wyd. kraj. 1960)
- W kościołach Meksyku (1927)
- W ślady Kolumba (cz. 1 Atlantyk-Pacyfik 1967, cz. 2 Królik i oceany 1968, cz. 3 W pępku Ameryki 1969)
- Walczący Gryf (1963)
- Westerplatte (1959)
- Wojna i pióro (1974)
- Wrzesień żagwiący (1947)
- Ziele na kraterze (1951, wyd. krajowe 1957)
- Zupa na gwoździu (1967, wyd. 3 pt. Zupa na gwoździu – doprawiona 1972)

Aleksandra Ziolkowska-Boehm has written introductions, footnotes, etc., to:

- Melchior Wankowicz, Reportaze zagraniczne (Reportage from Abroad), Kraków, 1981, ISBN 83-08-00488-1
- Series: Dziela emigracyjne i przedwojenne Melchiora Wankowicza (8 titles), Warsaw, 1989–1995
- Korespondencja Krystyny i Melchiora Wankowiczow (Correspondence between Krystyna and Melchior Wankowicz), Warsaw, 1992, ISBN 83-85443-21-5
- Jerzy Giedroyc and Melchior Wankowicz, Listy 1945–1963 (Series: Archiwum Kultury; correspondence between Jerzy Giedroyc and Melchior Wankowicz), Warsaw, 2000, ISBN 83-07-02779-9
- King i Krolik. Korespondencja Zofii i Melchiora Wankowiczow (correspondence between Zofia and Melchior Wankowicz), Warsaw, 2004, 2 Volumes, ISBN 83-7163-496-X; ISBN 83-7163-497-8.
- Series: Dziela Wszystkie Melchiora Wankowicza, 16 volumes, Warsaw, 2009–2011

== Legacy ==
A private journalism school on ulica Nowy Świat in Warsaw, the Higher School of Journalism, founded in 1995, is named after Wańkowicz.
