= ORP Podhalanin =

Torpedo boat

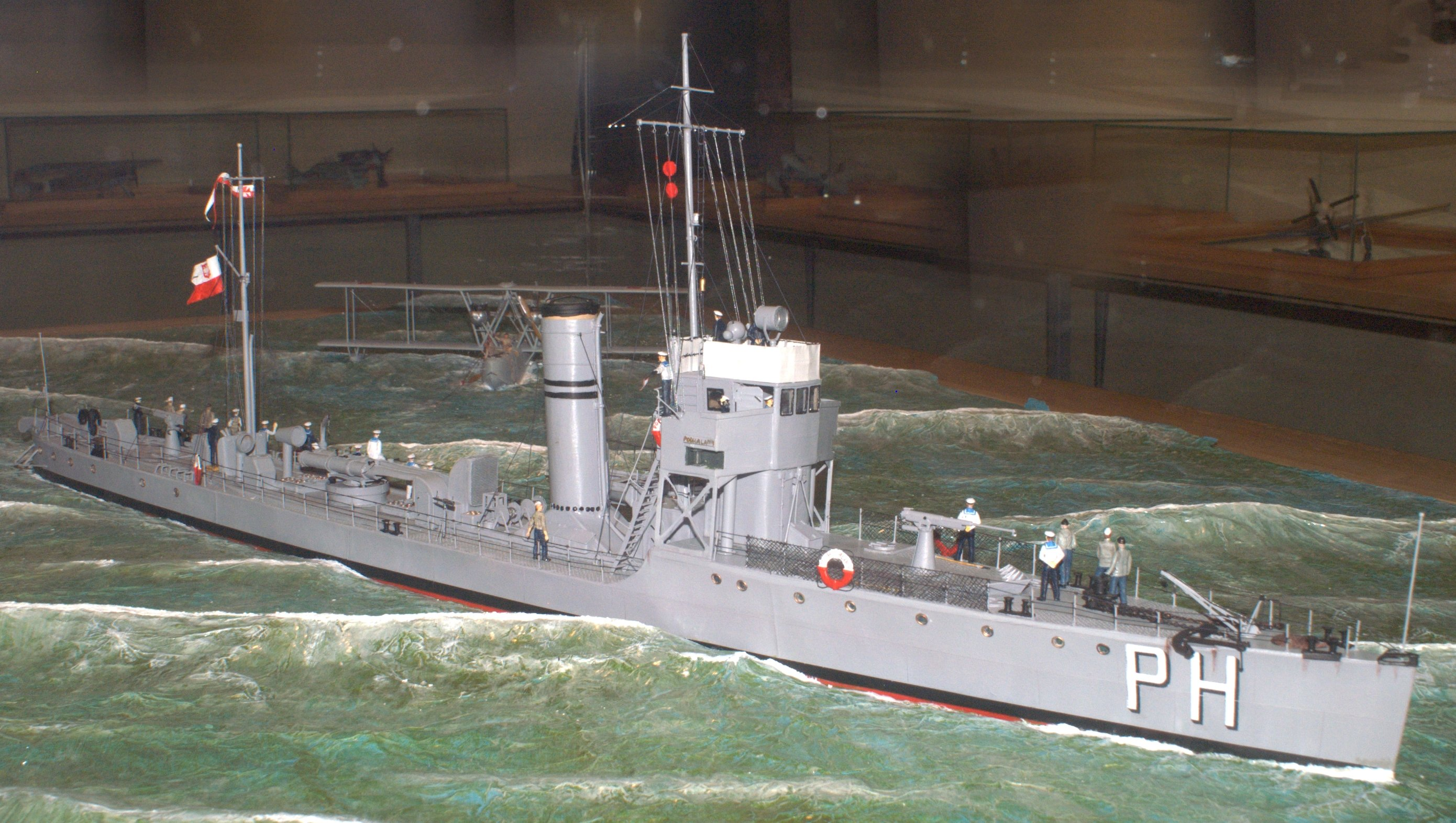

ORP Podhalanin - was a torpedo boat (former A-80) of the Kaiserliche Marine, and one of the first ships of the Polish Navy that was recreated after Poland regained its independence in 1918. The vessel was in service from 1924 to 1938.

She was built in 1917 as a small coastal torpedo boat by A.G. Vulcan in Stettin, Germany (now in Poland). The ship was transferred to Poland in 1919 and until 1921 named ORP Góral. Due to lack of funds, it was only in 1924 that the ship was refitted and officially commissioned. She was taken out of service as a combat ship in 1938 and used in various auxiliary roles until 1939. Her fate after the German invasion is unknown.

== Specifications ==
- Displacement: 330-335 tons, 381-392 tons full load
- Maximum speed: 28 knots
- Armament:
  - German service: 2 × 88 mm guns, 1 × 450 mm torpedo tubes (class armament, A-80 had unique armament of 3 × 88 mm guns and no torpedo tubes)
  - Polish service: 2 × 75 mm guns, 2 × 450 mm torpedo tubes

== Bibliography ==
- Dodson, Aidan (2019). "Beyond the Kaiser: The IGN's Destroyers and Torpedo Boats After 1918". In Jordan, John (ed.). Warship 2019. Oxford, UK: Osprey Publishing. pp. 129–144. ISBN 978-1-4728-3595-6.
