= Wilk-class submarine =

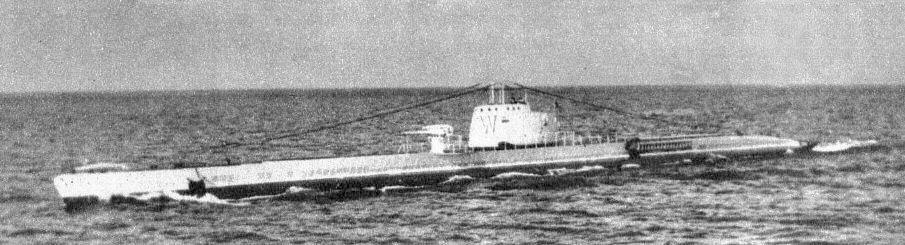
- ORP Wilk in 1937

Class overview
- Name: Wilk
- In commission: 12 April 1929 - 1955
- Completed: 3
- Lost: 0

General characteristics (at 1 September 1939)
- Type: submarine
- Displacement: 980 tons (surfaced); 1,250 tons (submerged)
- Length: 78.5 m (257 ft 7 in)
- Beam: 5.9 m (19 ft 4 in)
- Draught: 4.2 m (13 ft 9 in)
- Propulsion: Diesel-Vickers diesel: 1,800 hp (1,300 kW); electric engines: 1,200 hp (890 kW)
- Speed: 14.5 knots (26.9 km/h; 16.7 mph) surface; 9.5 knots (17.6 km/h; 10.9 mph) submerged
- Range: 3,500 nautical miles (6,500 km; 4,000 mi) @ 10 knots (19 km/h; 12 mph); 100 nautical miles (190 km; 120 mi) @ 5 knots (9.3 km/h; 5.8 mph) submerged
- Complement: 46–54
- Armament: 1 × 100 mm (3.9 in) deck gun; 2 × 13.2 mm (0.52 in) deck anti-aircraft heavy machine guns (mounted in place of 40 mm gun from 1935 onwards); 4 × 550 mm (22 in) torpedo tubes, bow; 2 × 550 mm (22 in) (twin) rotating torpedo tubes, midship; 16 × 550 mm (22 in) torpedoes (6 in tubes and 10 reloads); 40 × mines
- Notes: Ships in class include: ORP Wilk; ORP Ryś; ORP Żbik

Wilk-class submarines of the Polish Navy included three boats: ORP Wilk, ORP Ryś and ORP Żbik. They served from 1931 until 1955. The boats were built in France. During World War II, one escaped to Britain and two were interned in Sweden.

The class design was based on that of the French submarine Pierre Chailley, which had been laid down in 1917 and was in service from 1923 to 1936. Running with diesel engines, they all possessed mine-laying capabilities. They had a top speed of 14.5 knots (26.9 km/h; 16.7 mph) surfaced, and 9.5 knots (17.6 km/h; 10.9 mph) submerged.

== Boats in class ==
There were three boats in the Wilk class.

List of Wilk-class submarines
Name	Builder	Launched	Fate
Wilk ('wolf')	Normand, Le Havre	12 April 1929	In reserve 1942, scrapped 1951
Ryś ('lynx')	ACL, Nantes	22 April 1929	Interned Sept. 1939, scrapped 1954
Żbik ('wildcat')	CNF, Caen	14 June 1931	Interned Sept. 1939, scrapped 1954
