= Worek Plan =

Polish naval operation in World War II

Coordinates: 55°38′N 18°54′E

Operation Worek
- Part of Invasion of Poland
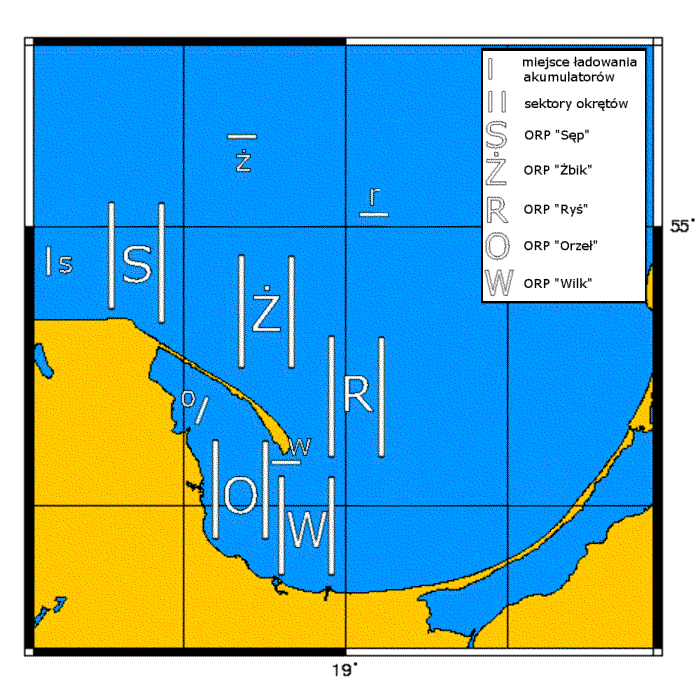
- Polish submarines sectors as in the Worek Plan. Legend: | - battery charging site || - sector of operation
Date	1–25 September 1939
Location	Baltic Sea
Result	Inconclusive

Belligerents
Poland	Germany

Commanders and leaders
(Poland) Adam Mohuczy	(Nazi Germany) Conrad Albrecht

Strength
5 submarines	2 pre-dreadnoughts 3 light cruisers 9 destroyers 1 torpedo boat 8 minesweepers 8 E-boats; 4 escorts 10 submarines

Casualties and losses
3 submarines damaged 4 submarines interned (including damaged) (Note: The submarine ORP Orzel later escaped Estonian internment.)	24 killed 1 minesweeper sunk

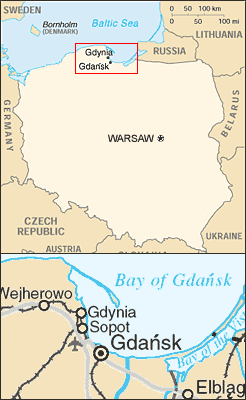
Worek Plan operational area on the map of Poland

The Worek Plan (or Operation Worek, Polish: Plan Worek, literally Plan Sack) was an operation of the Polish Navy in the first days of World War II, in which its five submarines formed a screen in order to prevent German naval forces from carrying out landings on the Polish coast, and to attack enemy ships bombarding Polish coastal fortifications, in particular the base on the Hel Peninsula.

The operation came to naught, as the Germans did not have any plans for naval landings. It caused the submarines to operate in a confined area near the shore in shallow waters, making them vulnerable to strong enemy anti-submarine forces. As a result, despite making a number of attempts, the submarines were unable to directly sink any enemy ships during the operation, although a mine placed by the Żbik did sink a German minesweeper. No Polish submarines were lost to enemy action, but they suffered progressive wear and tear, and technical problems, forcing the submarine commanders to break off their actions, effectively ending the operation by the middle of September 1939.

== Plan ==
The plan was created for the five Polish submarines Orzeł (Eagle), Wilk (Wolf), Sęp (Vulture), Żbik (Wild Cat) and Ryś (Lynx) to use in the event that superior enemy surface forces took control of the Baltic Sea (the Polish surface navy consisted only of four destroyers, some minelayers, minesweepers, and gunboats).

The submarines were to operate near the Polish coast, in the area of the Danzig Bay and the Hel Peninsula. They were to conserve their limited munitions for "significant military targets" (destroyer or larger) shelling the Polish coast or attempting to land forces on it and interdict naval traffic between the German mainland and East Prussia. Wilk, Ryś, and Żbik were to mine the Gulf of Danzig. The plan explicitly stated that the submarines were to act according to international law, and single, unarmed ships had to be warned before being attacked.

In the event that all Polish naval bases were overrun, the submarines were to operate in the Baltic before evacuating to Britain. If that wasn't possible, the plan called for them to seek internment in a neutral port.

Orzeł was to take the position furthest inside Danzig Bay, from Jastarnia to the estuary of the Vistula river. East of Orzeł, in the entry to the Bay, was the place for Wilk. The remaining three submarines were to operate north of the Bay: Sęp was further West near Rozewie, Ryś was further east, and Żbik in the middle. They had separate areas for recharging batteries during the night: Orzeł even deeper within Danzig Bay, and the other ships north of their positions.

At the beginning of September, Sęp, Ryś, and Żbik were at Hel, while Wilk and Orzel were in Oksywie.

== Execution ==
The Worek Plan was put into action with the German invasion of Poland, after a distress call was received from the garrison at Westerplatte on the morning 1 September 1939. Several hours after hostilities started, the submarines received communications by radio to open the envelopes containing orders to implement the Worek Plan. Wilk loaded 10 torpedoes, 22 mines, and 114 100mm shells (for the deck gun) before departure. Due to heavy air activity, the submarines had to approach their positions submerged. Orzel was ordered to attack the Schleswig-Holstein, should the pre-dreadnought leave Danzig. By the evening of the same day the last submarine (Sęp) arrived in its sector.

On the morning of 2 September Wilk attempted an attack on the German destroyer Z15 Erich Steinbrinck, but was forced to withdraw after being attacked by supporting vessels. Later that day Sep launched a single torpedo at the German destroyer Z14 Friedrich Ihn from 400 yards out. The torpedo missed and the destroyer dropped depth charges, severely damaging the submarine. The next day the German submarine U-14 (1935) launched a torpedo at Sep, but it exploded prematurely. On 4 September Orzel's captain, Lieutenant Commander Henryk Kłoczkowski, deemed it impossible to continue with the operation in his sector, and decided to withdraw into the Baltic Sea. The submarine was attacked by the German minesweepers M3 and M4. One depth charge exploded just above Orzel, knocking out all lights and sending it crashing into the sea bed. The submarine escaped that night under the cover of darkness. Faced with an oil leak, Kłoczkowski chose to seek refuge in Tallinn, Estonia. The next day Wilk attempted to lay mines off of Hel, but was forced to abort in the face of an attack by German vessels. After this, its captain, Lieutenant Commander Krawczyk decided to withdraw northward. On 7 September the German submarine U-22 made a failed torpedo attack on the Żbik.

On 11 September Wilk prepared to attack the German cruiser Admiral Hipper, but the ship made an unexpected course change and the submarine wasn't able to proceed. Later that day, the Polish Naval Command issued an order to all of the submarines to seek British waters. Wilk surfaced off the Swedish coast. Three days later it spotted the German destroyer Z4 Richard Beitzen and torpedo boat T107 in Øresund. Believing Wilk to be a Swedish submarine on a neutrality patrol, the German ships didn't take any action. Wilk proceeded to withdraw through Kattegat.

Sęp didn't receive the order to abort the operation until 13 September. With the submarine heavily damaged, and Hel being too dangerous to return to, the crew headed for Sweden. Ryś, also damaged, interned itself in Sweden on 18 September. Żbik followed suit on 25 September.

On 1 October one of the mines Żbik had laid sank the German minesweeper M-85 with a loss of all 24 hands.

== Aftermath ==
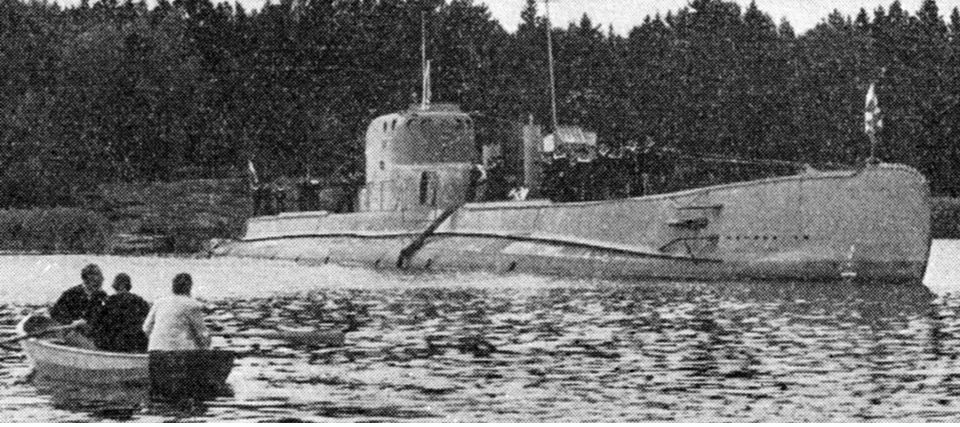
ORP Sęp interned in Sweden

Orzeł docked in Tallinn on the night of 14 September for rest and repairs (international law allowed 24 hours before the ship was to be interned). Under German pressure the Estonians interned the submarine and its crew. In an event known as the Orzeł incident, the crew reassumed control of their vessel and escaped into the Baltic. After several fruitless weeks at sea, the submarine reached the United Kingdom on 14 October and continued fighting under Royal Navy command. Orzel went missing in 1940.

Sęp surfaced outside of Stockholm on 17 September and was from then on interned.

Ryś, damaged and unable to engage German units, eventually was interned in a Swedish port from 18 September.

Wilk successfully navigated the Danish Straits and arrived in the United Kingdom on 20 September. The submarine survived the war.

Żbik was low on provisions and the crew interned the submarine in a Swedish port on 25 September.

=== Assessment ===
The Germans had no intention to carry out the landings which the Worek Plan was designed to oppose. However, an operational plan failed mainly due to its pure defensive nature, as an opposite to the aggressive nature of submarines, by their characteristics not intended and prepared to fulfill defensive roles. According to contemporary research, Polish submarine campaign in September 1939 failed due to misunderstanding of the nature of modern submarine warfare in high command of Polish Navy, particularly by Commander-in-Chief of the Polish Naval Command vice admiral Józef Unrug, who refused to accept any of a few offensive operational plans prepared by the Chief of Submarine Squadron commander Aleksander Mohuczy. One of them, the best known today, was an offensive operational plan codenamed Burza (Thunderstorm), that assumed independent search of targets, with free maneuvering and attacking of enemy ships and transports between Świnoujście (German: Swinemünde) and East Prussia. In consideration and planning was also a plan of actions on the sea routes between harbors of Germany and the Swedish port of Luleå

As a result, Polish submarines deployed along Polish coast, in proximity to their own naval base, were deprived of chances to find targets – while they were exposed there to operations of German air and light naval antisubmarine units. Therefore, although no Polish submarine was sunk in this stage of war, the operation had no discernible impact on the September campaign.

== See also ==
- Battle of the Danzig Bay
- Peking Plan
