= Valery Karnitsky =

Belarusian footballer

Personal information
- Date of birth: 20 August 1991 (age 35)
- Place of birth: Baranovichi, Byelorussian SSR, Soviet Union
- Position: Midfielder

Senior career*
Years	Team	Apps	(Gls)
2010	Vigvam Smolevichi	16	(2)
2011–2012	Dinamo-BNTU Minsk (futsal)		
2013	Neman Stolbtsy		
2014–2015	Baranovichi	37	(2)
2016	Dinamo Brest	8	(1)
2016	→ Belshina Bobruisk (loan)	8	(0)
2017	Smolevichi-STI	20	(0)
2018	Neman-Agro Stolbtsy	12	(0)
2019–2021	Arsenal Dzerzhinsk	43	(2)
2023	Kronon Stolbtsy	5	(0)
- * Club domestic league appearances and goals as of 31 December 2023

Valery Karnitsky (Belarusian: Валеры Карнiцкi; Russian: Валерий Карницкий; born 20 August 1991) is a Belarusian professional footballer.

His elder brother Alyaksandr Karnitsky is also a professional footballer.

== Honours ==
Dinamo Brest

- Belarusian Cup winner: 2016–17
