= ORP Ryś (1929) =

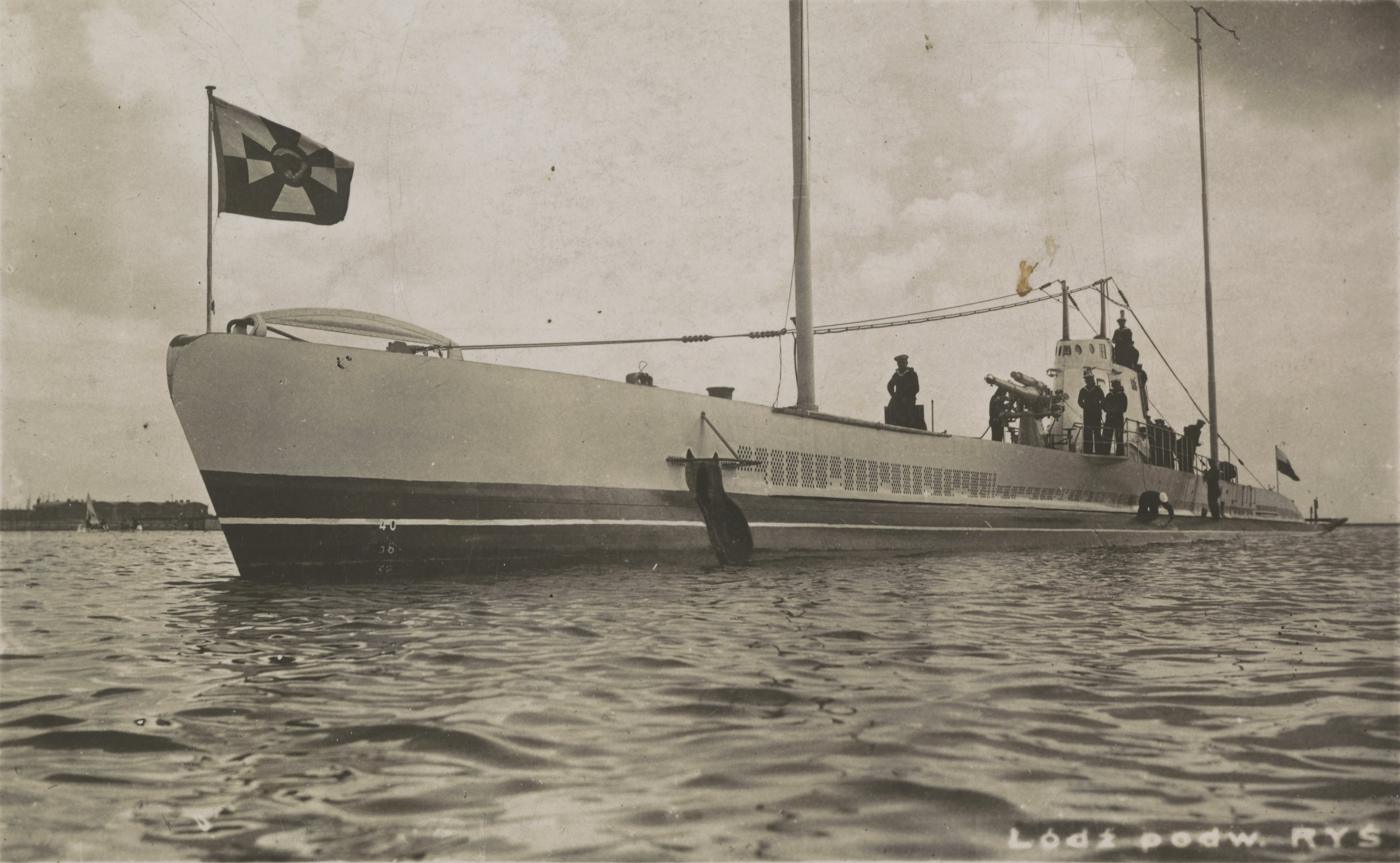
- ORP Ryś

History

Poland
- Name: ORP Ryś
- Namesake: lynx (in Polish)
- Laid down: 1927
- Launched: 22 April 1929
- Commissioned: 1932
- Decommissioned: 1955
- Fate: Scrapped, 1956

General characteristics
- Class & type: Wilk-class submarine
- Displacement: 980 tons (surfaced); 1,250 tons (submerged)
- Length: 78.5 m (257 ft 7 in)
- Beam: 5.9 m (19 ft 4 in)
- Draught: 4.2 m (13 ft 9 in)
- Propulsion: Diesel-Vickers diesel: 1,800 hp (1,300 kW); electric engines: 1,200 hp (890 kW)
- Speed: 14.5 knots (26.9 km/h; 16.7 mph) surface; 9.5 knots (17.6 km/h; 10.9 mph) submerged
- Range: 3,500 nautical miles (6,500 km; 4,000 mi) @ 10 knots (19 km/h; 12 mph); 100 nautical miles (190 km; 120 mi) @ 5 knots (9.3 km/h; 5.8 mph) submerged
- Complement: 46–54
- Armament: 1 × 100 mm (3.9 in) deck gun; 2 × 13.2 mm (0.52 in) deck anti-aircraft heavy machine guns (mounted in place of 40 mm gun from 1935 onwards); 4 × 550 mm (22 in) torpedo tubes, bow; 2 × 550 mm (22 in) (twin) rotating torpedo tubes, midship; 16 × 550 mm (22 in) torpedoes (6 in tubes and 10 reloads); 40 × mines

ORP Ryś was a Wilk-class submarine which saw service in the Polish Navy from 1931 to 1955. Her name means Lynx in Polish.

== History ==
Ryś was laid down in 1927 in Nantes, France; launched in 1929; and entered service in 1932. When World War II began on September 1, 1939, she took part in the Worek Plan for the defense of the Polish coast. After suffering battle damage, the submarine withdrew to neutral Swedish waters and was interned on September 17. After the war, she returned to Poland in October 1945 and served in the navy of the Polish People's Republic until 1955. She was scrapped in 1956.

A second ORP Ryś (1959) was a minesweeper launched in 1959 and decommissioned in 1989.

== Gallery ==
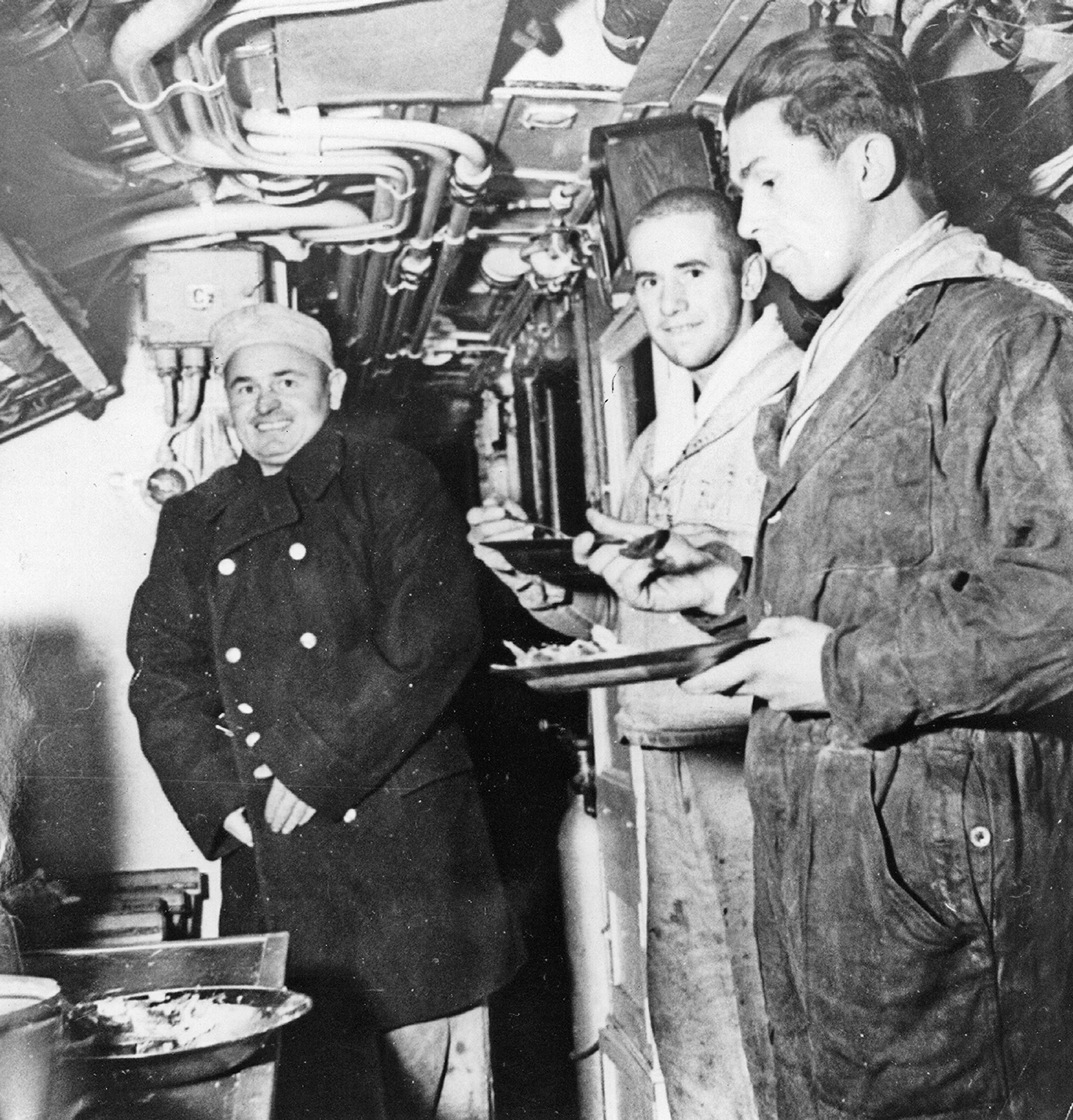
Polish soldiers eating dinner in ORP Ryś.

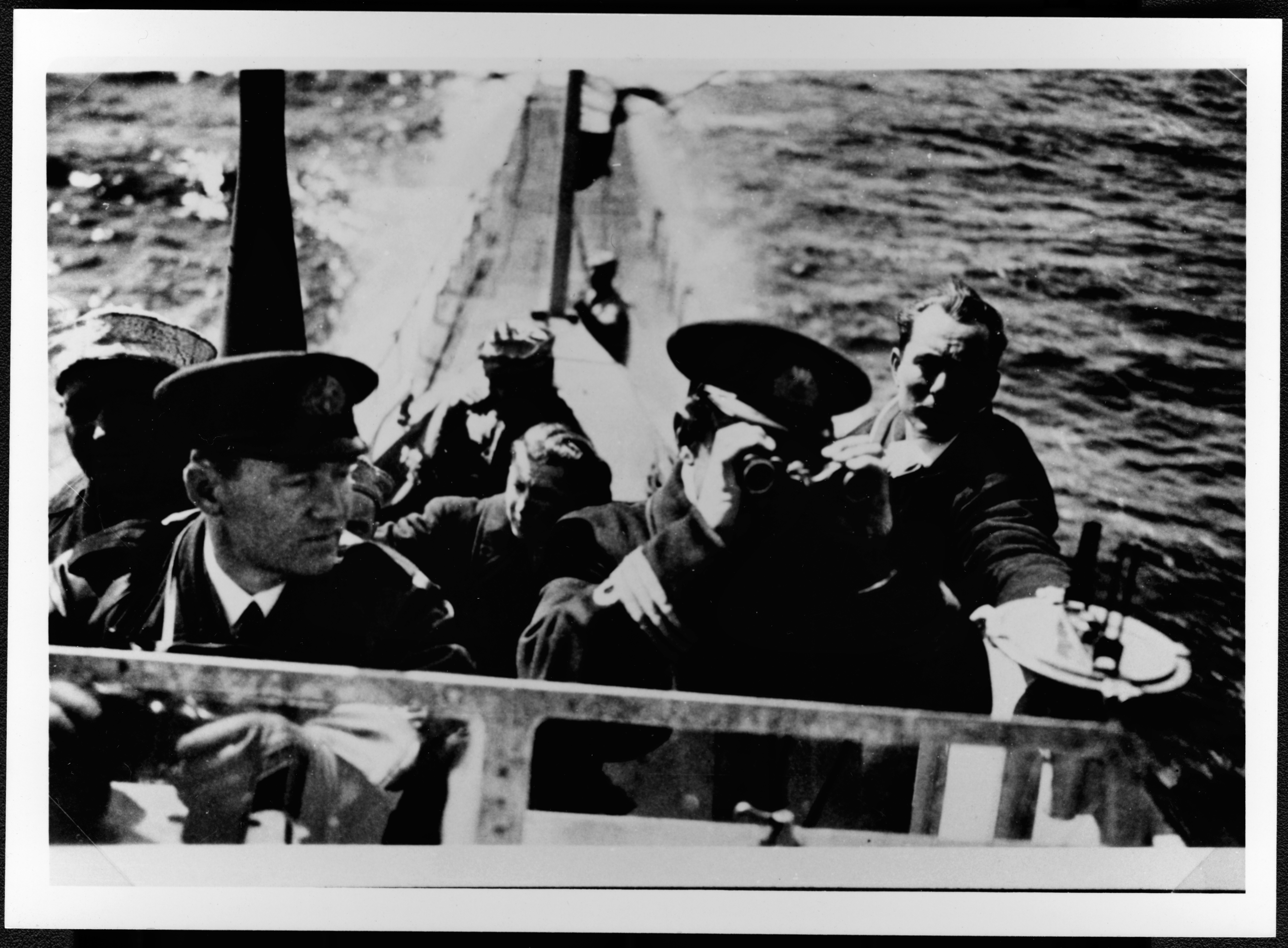
Commander Captain Grochowsky and Deputy Commander Rekner on Ryś in the Baltic Sea in September 1939.

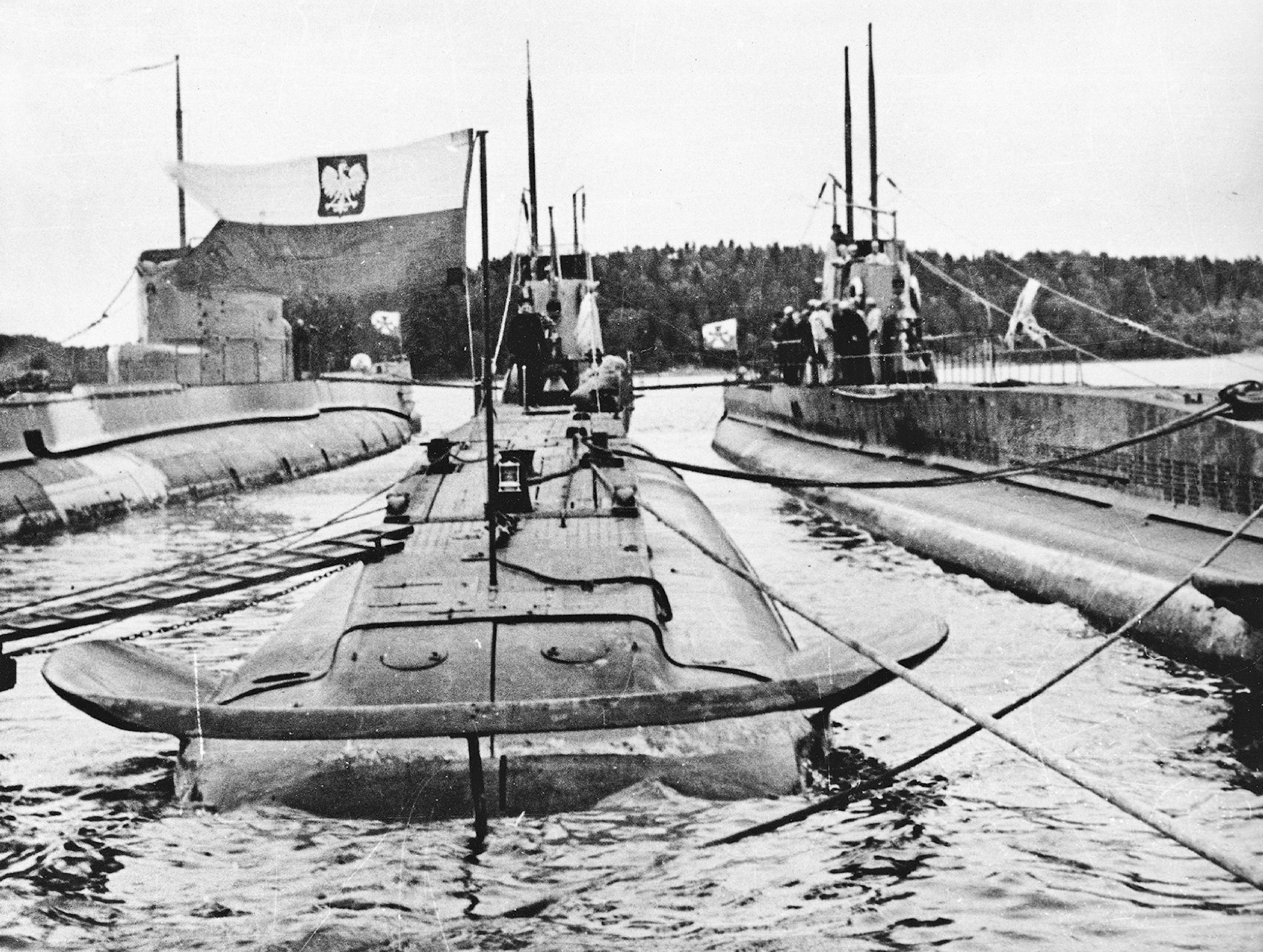
The three submarines Sęp, Ryś, and Żbik at the Marielund internment camp outside Mariefred, with the Polish flag raised on one of them.

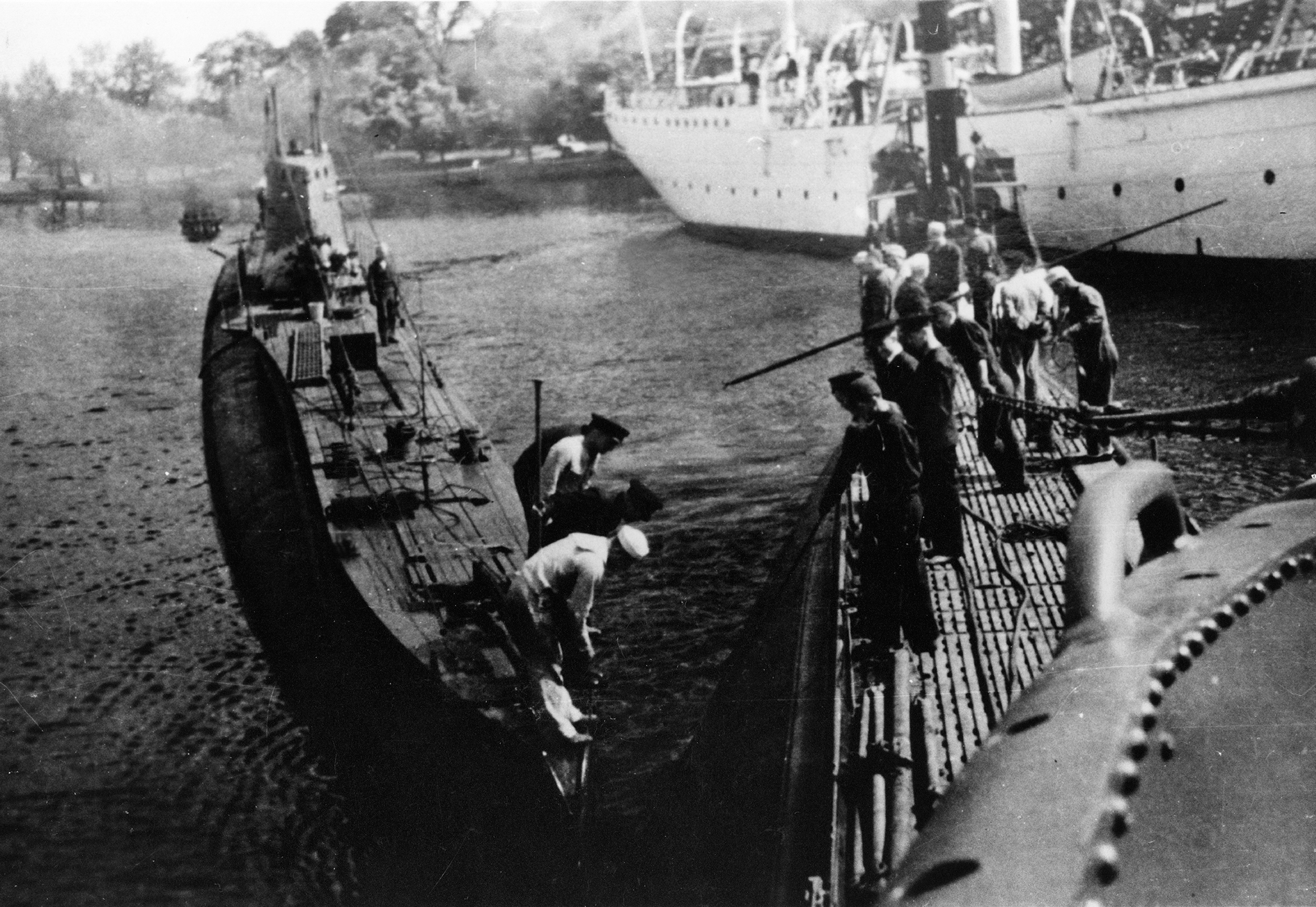
The three submarines were moved to Stockholm for repairs in April 1940. The crews were housed on the sailing ship Dar Pomorza, seen in the background.
