= ORP Żbik (1930) =

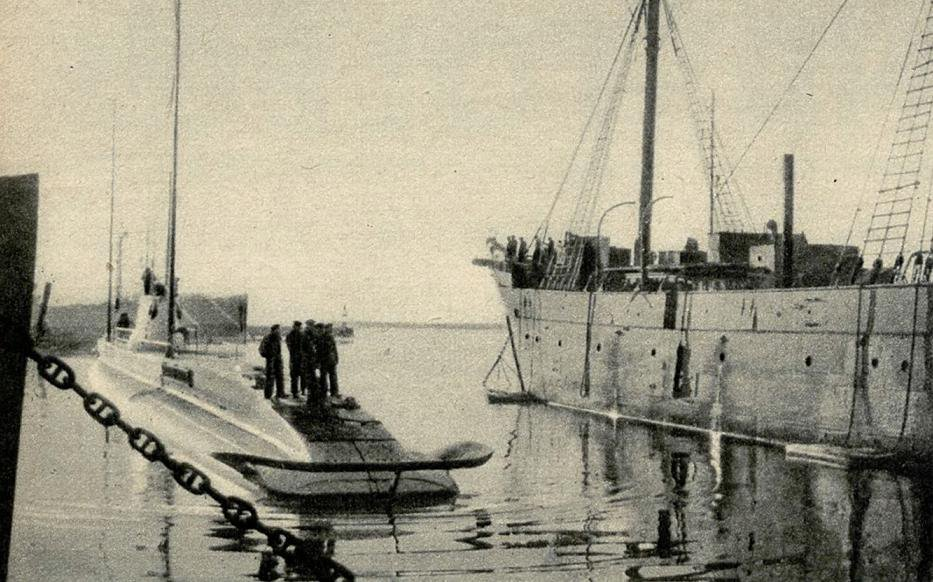
- ORP Żbik next to the training sailship Lwów

History

Poland
- Name: ORP Żbik
- Namesake: wildcat (in Polish)
- Laid down: 1927
- Launched: 14 June 1930
- Completed: 20 February 1932
- Commissioned: 1932
- Decommissioned: 1955
- Fate: Scrapped, 1956

General characteristics
- Class & type: Wilk-class submarine
- Displacement: 980 tons (surfaced); 1,250 tons (submerged)
- Length: 78.5 m (257 ft 7 in)
- Beam: 5.9 m (19 ft 4 in)
- Draught: 4.2 m (13 ft 9 in)
- Propulsion: Diesel-Vickers diesel: 1,800 hp (1,300 kW); electric engines: 1,200 hp (890 kW)
- Speed: 14.5 knots (26.9 km/h; 16.7 mph) surface; 9.5 knots (17.6 km/h; 10.9 mph) submerged
- Range: 3,500 nautical miles (6,500 km; 4,000 mi) @ 10 knots (19 km/h; 12 mph); 100 nautical miles (190 km; 120 mi) @ 5 knots (9.3 km/h; 5.8 mph) submerged
- Complement: 46–54
- Armament: 1 × 100 mm (3.9 in) deck gun; 2 × 13.2 mm (0.52 in) deck anti-aircraft heavy machine guns (mounted in place of 40 mm gun from 1935 onwards); 4 × 550 mm (22 in) torpedo tubes, bow; 2 × 550 mm (22 in) (twin) rotating torpedo tubes, midship; 16 × 550 mm (22 in) torpedoes (6 in tubes and 10 reloads); 40 × mines

ORP Żbik was a Wilk-class submarine which saw service in the Polish Navy from 1932 to 1955. Her name means "wildcat" in Polish.

Żbik was laid down in 1927 in Caen, launched in 1930, and entered service in 1932. When World War II began on 1 September 1939, she took part in the Worek Plan for the defense of the Polish coast. According to the plan she laid her mines, one of which sank a small (525 t) German minesweeper M85 on 1 October. After suffering battle damage and shortages of fuel, the submarine withdrew to neutral Swedish waters and was interned on 25 September. After the war, she returned to Poland in October 1945 and served in the navy of the Polish People's Republic until 1955. She was scrapped in 1956.

A second ORP Żbik was a T43-class minesweeper served by the Polish Navy from 1959 to 1989.
