= ORP Wilk (1929) =

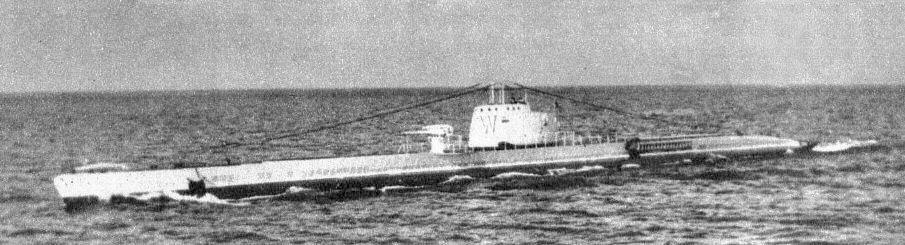

History

Poland
- Name: ORP Wilk
- Namesake: wolf (in Polish)
- Builder: Chantiers et Ateliers Augustin Normand Le Havre, France
- Laid down: 1927
- Launched: April 12, 1929
- Commissioned: October 31, 1931
- Decommissioned: April 2, 1942 to reserve submarine
- Decommissioned: 1953
- Fate: Scrapped 1954

General characteristics
- Class & type: Wilk-class submarine
- Displacement: 980 tons (surfaced); 1,250 tons (submerged)
- Length: 78.5 m (257 ft 7 in)
- Beam: 5.9 m (19 ft 4 in)
- Draught: 4.2 m (13 ft 9 in)
- Propulsion: Diesel-Vickers diesel: 1,800 hp (1,300 kW); electric engines: 1,200 hp (890 kW)
- Speed: 14.5 knots (26.9 km/h; 16.7 mph) surface; 9.5 knots (17.6 km/h; 10.9 mph) submerged
- Range: 3,500 nautical miles (6,500 km; 4,000 mi) @ 10 knots (19 km/h; 12 mph); 100 nautical miles (190 km; 120 mi) @ 5 knots (9.3 km/h; 5.8 mph) submerged
- Complement: 46–54
- Armament: 1 × 100 mm (3.9 in) deck gun; 2 × 13.2 mm (0.52 in) deck anti-aircraft heavy machine guns (mounted in place of 40 mm gun from 1935 onwards); 4 × 550 mm (22 in) torpedo tubes, bow; 2 × 550 mm (22 in) (twin) rotating torpedo tubes, midship; 10 × 550 mm (22 in) torpedoes (6 in tubes and 4 reloads); 40 × mines

ORP Wilk was the lead ship of her class of mine-laying submarines of the Polish Navy. The ship saw service in the Polish Navy from 1931 to 1951. Her name meant "Wolf" in Polish.

== History ==
Wilk was laid down in 1927 at Chantiers et Ateliers Augustin Normand shipyard at Le Havre in France. Launched on April 12, 1929, she was commissioned into the Polish Navy on 31 October 1931.

When World War II began on September 1, 1939, Wilk, commanded by Captain Boguslaw Krawczyk, took part in the Worek Plan for the defence of the Polish coast, operating in Gdańsk Bay. On September 2 she spotted a destroyer Erich Steinbrinck, but could not attack it, because she fell herself under attack by minesweepers (the German report on firing a torpedo at Steinbrinck is not confirmed by the Poles). On September 3 she deployed her mines as planned. On September 4 and 5 the Wilk was under continuous depth charge attacks and had to lay on the sea bottom during daytime, suffering minor damage. During the next days, attempts at attacking enemy shipping were unsuccessful. Then she left the Polish coast, successfully passing the Danish Straits (Øresund) on September 14/15, escaping from the Baltic Sea and arriving in Great Britain on September 20. Only ORP Orzeł managed to accomplish the same feat later; the other three Polish submarines were interned in neutral Sweden.

On December 7, 1939 one of the mines laid by the submarine in September sank a German fishing boat MFK Pil 55 Heimat (13 GRT) at position 54°37′05″N 19°47′00″E.

In February, 1940 the ORP Wilk was involved in an incident in the Kattegat. She was reported to have sunk a German U-boat, damaged another, and was then depth-charged for thirty hours. The Royal Navy Liaison Officer onboard, Sub. Lt. Cyril Branson R.N., got the Captain to surface and assisted in bringing the badly damaged Wilk safety back to Rosyth. Sub. Lt. Branson was later awarded the Cross of Valour (Polish: Krzyż Walecznych) for his role in this action.

=== Collision ===
On June 20, 1940 at 0.25 am, the ORP Wilk rammed an unidentified object at position 56°54′N 03°30′E. There was a long dispute upon this incident. The commander reported, that the Wilk had collided with a submarine. The 2nd in command Sub. Lt. Bolesław Romanowski, being the officer of the watch then, reported, that he had seen a "triangular shape". However, in his post-war memoirs "Torpeda w celu" he claimed, that he deliberately rammed a German U-boat. According to new research, the only German submarine in that area was U-99, but it did not report any damage nor encounter with the enemy on that day. The other submarine U-122, lost after June 21, was too far away. If submarines are considered, most probably would be the Dutch submarine HNLMS O 13, also lost in that area around that time.

However, according to newest analysis of Wilk's damages and all reports, the object was most likely a German minefield protector buoy (Sprengboje), since only both Wilk's propellers got damaged, while a rudder and rudder's connector below them, were intact, which was unlikely in case of ramming a submarine. Moreover, searching of the O 13 wreck in area of the Wilk's reported collision was fruitless.

=== Further career ===
The Wilk undertook nine patrols from the British bases, without success. The last was between 8 and 20 January 1941, then the submarine was assigned to training duties. Due to her poor mechanical condition, ORP Wilk was decommissioned as a reserve submarine on April 2, 1942.

On 28 September 1946 the Polish government-in-exile gave Wilk to British control. She remained laid up at Harwich. Because of her poor condition, only in October 1952 she was towed to Poland. She was declared unfit to service, decommissioned from the Polish Navy, and scrapped in 1954.

A second ORP Wilk, a Foxtrot-class submarine, served in the Polish Navy from 1987 to 2003.

== Bibliography ==
- Marek Twardowski (in Polish): "Podwodne drapieżniki" – stawiacze min typu Wilk ("Undersea predators" – Wilk class minelayers), in: Morza, Statki i Okręty nr. 3/1998, pp. 23–26
