= Polish Navy order of battle in 1939 =

This article details the order of battle of the Polish Navy prior to the outbreak of World War II and the Polish Defensive War of 1939. Following World War I, Poland's shoreline was relatively short and included no major seaports. In the 1920s and 1930s, such ports were built in Gdynia and Hel, and the Polish Navy underwent a modernisation program under the leadership of Counter-Admiral Józef Unrug (Commanding Officer of the Fleet) and Vice-Admiral Jerzy Świrski (Chief of Naval Staff). Ships were acquired from France, the Netherlands, and the United Kingdom, and the navy was to be able to secure the Polish supply lines in case of a war against the Soviet Union. By September 1939 the Polish Navy consisted of 5 submarines, 4 destroyers, and various support vessels and mine-warfare ships.

This force was no match for the large German Navy, and so a strategy of harassment and indirect engagement was implemented. Lacking numerical superiority, Polish naval commanders decided to execute the Peking Plan, an operation to withdraw most of the naval vessels to British ports, from where the ships were to secure convoys with aid for Poland, either bound for Gdynia or Constanca in Romania.

== Peace-time organization ==
The Polish Navy was organized into a Warsaw-based Naval Command, subordinate to the Commander in Chief of the Polish forces, and several naval and riverine bases and flotillas. The navy was commanded by Counter Admiral Józef Unrug and his Chief of Naval Staff Jerzy Świrski. Apart from its bases, the navy also commanded the Westerplatte Transit Wharf, an extraterritorial base and depot in the Free City of Danzig, commanded by Henryk Sucharski and Franciszek Dąbrowski. The naval bases included:

- Gdynia-Oksywie kmdr por. Mieczysław Adamowicz
- Hel kmdr Włodzimierz Steyer
- Puck Naval air base (2 squadrons and 1 support air group under kmdr por. pil. Edward Szystowski)
- Gdynia Naval Officers' School

The navy itself was divided onto four flotillas:

- Destroyer flotilla under Lieutenant Commander Roman Stankiewicz
- Submarine flotilla under Counter Admiral Adam Mohuczy
- Pińsk river flotilla under Commander Witold Zajączkowski
- Vistula river detachment under Lieutenant Commander Roman Kanafoyski

Finally, under the influence of French maritime traditions the Naval Officers' School in Gdynia (under Captain Tadeusz Morgenstern-Podjazd) was considered a separate naval base. It used a variety of school ships, including most of the Polish surface vessels.

== War-time organization ==
Prior to the outbreak of World War II, on July 10, 1939, the defence of Polish Pomerania was reorganized into two separate commands under the leadership of Counter Admiral Unrug. The Land Coastal Command (Lądowa Obrona Wybrzeża, also translated as Land Coastal Defence) and Naval Coastal Command (Morska Obrona Wybrzeża, also translated as Naval Coastal Defence) formed the Coastal Defence Group (Grupa Obrony Wybrzeża). They were supported by the Naval Air Squadron (Morski Dywizjon Lotniczy).

=== Land Coastal Command ===
The Land Coastal Command (Lądowa Obrona Wybrzeża, LOW), subordinate to the Toruń-based military area command led by General Władysław Bortnowski, was led by Colonel Józef Sass-Hoszowski and, since July 23, by Colonel Stanisław Dąbek. It was to organize the defence of the Polish seashore, the borders with Nazi Germany and Free City of Danzig, as well as to prepare the defence of the Polish naval bases and the Westerplatte outpost in Danzig.

As it was clear that the Polish defenders of the so-called Polish Corridor would be cut off from the Polish mainland, the defence was organized into several fortified lines that were to shield the naval base of Hel Peninsula and the city of Gdynia from all sides, and moved from General Bortnowski command to that of Counter Admiral Józef Unrug. The units included:

- Wejherowo Independent Detachment (Odział Wydzielony Wejherowo; west of Wejherowo) under Lieutenant Colonel Kazimierz Pruszkowski
  - 1st Marine Rifles Regiment
  - Puck National Defence Battalion
- Redłowo Independent Detachment (Odział Wydzielony Redłowo; south of Gdynia) under Lieutenant Colonel Ignacy Szpunar
  - 2nd Marine Rifles Regiment
  - 1st Reserve Infantry Battalion
- Kartuzy Independent Detachment (Odział Wydzielony Kartuzy) under Captain Marian Mordawski
  - Gdynia II National Defence battalion
  - Kartuzy National Defence battalion
- Gdynia I National Defence battalion (near Koleczkowo)

Altogether, the forces subordinate to Colonel Dąbek numbered about 15,000 men.

Separate from the Land Coastal Defence were:

- the Hel Fortified Area (Rejon Umocniony Hel, ca. 3,000 men) under Ctr. Adm. Włodzimierz Steyer
  - supported by 4th battalion of the Border Defence Corps;
  - Heliodor Laskowski's Artillery Battery No. 31
- Westerplatte garrison (ca. 200 men)

The remainder of the Polish forces, including improvised units, the mobilized Police, the Polish Border Guard, and the Border Defence Corps, were to defend the outskirts of Gdynia and Oksywie Heights, while the 4th battalion of the Border Defence Corps was to defend Hel. The anti-air defence was provided by the 1st and 2nd battalion of AA artillery, with 14 75 mm guns wz.22/24 and 14 40 mm wz. 38 guns.

=== Naval Coastal Command ===
The Naval Coastal Command (Morska Obrona Wybrzeża, MOW) included all of the Polish naval vessels, as well as the coastal artillery batteries of Hel and Oksywie. Out of the destroyer flotilla, all but one were withdrawn to Great Britain during Operation Peking. These included ORP Burza under Lt. Cmdr. Stanisław Nahorski, ORP Błyskawica under Lt. Cmdr. Włodzimierz Kodrębski and ORP Grom under Lt. Cmdr. Aleksander Hulewicz.

The only large surface vessels to be left in Poland before the outbreak of hostilities were the heavy minelayer ORP Gryf under Stefan Kwiatkowski (later replaced by Lieutenant Commander Wiktor Łomidze) and its escort, the destroyer ORP Wicher under Stefan de Walden.

The submarine flotilla was left in Poland with the task of disrupting the enemy movement in the area of the Bay of Gdańsk, as well as to lay mines on the routes from Germany to East Prussian ports in the Operation Worek. Commanded by Lieutenant Commander Adam Mohuczy, the flotilla included:

- ORP Wilk under Captain Bogusław Krawczyk
- ORP Żbik under Lieutenant Commander Michał Żebrowski
- ORP Ryś under Lieutenant Commander Aleksander Grochowski
- ORP Sęp under Lieutenant Commander Władysław Salomon
- ORP Orzeł under Lieutenant Commander Henryk Kłoczkowski

Apart from the abovementioned ships, a number of other vessels were left in the Polish naval bases, including several smaller torpedo boats, mine trawlers, minelayers and auxiliary vessels. The Minelayer/Minesweeper Flotilla (Flotylla Minowców) was composed mostly of the so-called birdies (ptaszki, a nickname coined after the fact that all of the Jaskółka class ships were named after a different species of non-raptor birds).

- ORP Czajka
- ORP Mewa
- ORP Jaskółka
- ORP Rybitwa
- ORP Czapla
- ORP Żuraw

Two obsolete gunboats, the ORP Generał Haller and ORP Komendant Piłsudski were grouped in the so-called group of gunboats. Other ships left in the bases of Gdynia and Hel included frogmen support ship ORP Nurek, school artillery ship ORP Mazur and mobilized patrol boat of the Border Guard, ORP Batory.

=== Naval Air Squadron ===
The Naval Air Squadron (Morski Dywizjon Lotniczy) was composed of two squadrons of seaplanes, both based in Puck and commanded by Lieutenant Commander Edward Szystowski. The squadron consisted of roughly 17 obsolete planes (mostly Lublin R-VIII and Lublin R-XIII Hydro of various versions), three liaison planes (one RWD-14 Czapla and two RWD-17), and a single modern CANT Z.506 Airone, purchased in Italy.

Both squadron were to provide reconnaissance for the ships of the Polish Navy, while fighter cover was to be provided by the organic squadrons of Army Pomorze fighting in southern Pomerania. However, the Naval Air Squadron was mostly destroyed on the ground on September 1, with its commander being the first Allied naval officer killed in action in World War II.

== Riverine flotillas ==
During the Polish-Bolshevik War the Pinsk Marshes in modern Belarus proved to be almost impassable to troops of both sides. Lack of roads and railways posed a serious danger to infantry and cavalry that could easily be cut off both by the enemy and the weather. Because of that, a number of river monitors were either constructed or acquired from private owners and armed. They were used on the Pripiat River, as well as its extensive river basin. After the war, some of the ships were returned to their owners, while the rest remained in active service and were pressed into the so-called Pinsk Flotilla.

In peacetime, the Riverine Flotilla of the Polish Navy, as it was officially called, operated on the Pina River, as well as on Pripyat and Strumień. It served as a mobile reserve of the Border Defence Corps and was to support the front in case of a war with the Soviet Union. Prior to the outbreak of the Polish Defensive War, a number of ships and detachments of the Riverine Flotilla were moved to the Vistula River as a Separated Detachment of the Vistula River (Oddział Wydzielony Rzeki Wisły), better known as the Vistula Flotilla. During the fight against the Soviets and the Germans, most of the ships were sunk by their crews to avoid capture.

== See also ==
- Battle of the Danzig Bay
- Battle of Gdynia
- Battle of Kępa Oksywska
- Battle of Hel
- Worek Plan
- Orzeł incident
- Polish River Fleet
- Polish contribution to World War II
