= Battle of Hel =

Battle in Poland during WWII

- Part of the invasion of Poland
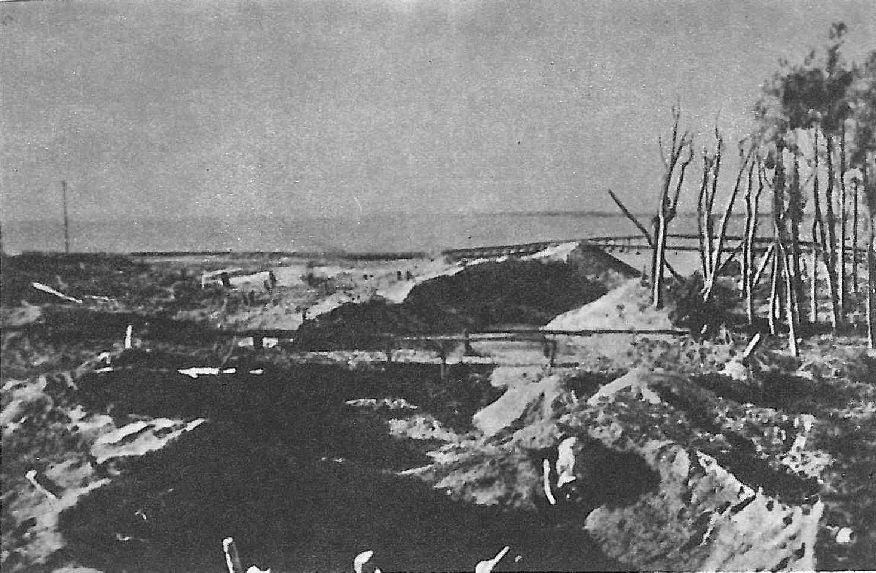
- Craters, post-detonation of Polish torpedo warheads in the Chałupy area
Date	1 September – 2 October 1939
Location	Hel Peninsula, Pomeranian Voivodeship, Poland 54°38′30″N 18°46′53″E
Result	German victory

Belligerents
Nazi Germany	Second Polish Republic

Commanders and leaders
(Nazi Germany) Friedrich-Georg Eberhardt	(Second Polish Republic) Józef Unrug (Second Polish Republic) Włodzimierz Steyer (Second Polish Republic) Adam Mohuczy

Strength
38,000 infantry^{a} 2 pre-dreadnoughts 2 destroyers Dozens of aircraft	2,800 infantry 1 destroyer 1 large minelayer Several light naval craft

Casualties and losses
Luftwaffe: 46–53 aircraft Heer: several dozen killed and wounded Kriegsmarine: 1 destroyer damaged 1 pre-dreadnought lightly damaged 1 minesweeper sunk	50 killed, 150 wounded, rest taken prisoner 1 destroyer sunk 1 minelayer sunk All light craft sunk, damaged, and / or captured.
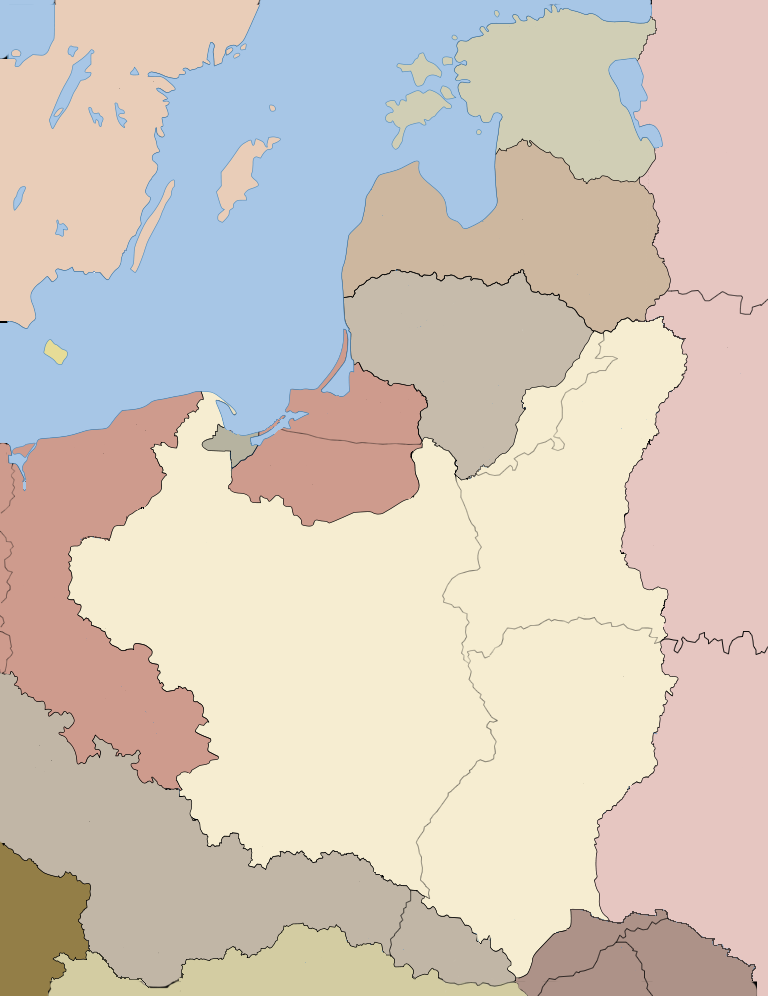
- Location within Poland, 1937 borders

The Battle of Hel (Polish: Obrona Helu, literally "the Defense of Hel") was a World War II engagement fought from 1 September to 2 October 1939 on the Hel Peninsula, of the Baltic Sea coast, between invading German forces and defending Polish units during the German invasion of Poland (also known in Polish historiography as the September Campaign). The defense of the Hel Peninsula took place around the Hel Fortified Area, a system of Polish fortifications that had been constructed in the 1930s near the interwar border with the German Third Reich.

Beginning on 20 September 1939, after the Polish Army Pomorze had been defeated in the Battle of Tuchola Forest and after other Polish coastal strongholds had capitulated in the Battle of Westerplatte, Battle of Gdynia and the Battle of Kępa Oksywska, Hel was the only substantial pocket of Polish military resistance left in northern Poland. It was also the site of the invasion's only naval surface engagement.

The Germans blockaded the defenders of the Hel Peninsula and did not launch major land operations until the end of September 1939. Some 2,800 Polish soldiers under Rear Admiral Włodzimierz Steyer, part of the Land Coastal Defence formation, defended the Hel Fortified Area for about 32 days, until they surrendered^{b} due to low supplies and morale.

== Prelude ==
Construction of a Polish Navy port at Hel, on the tip of the Hel Peninsula, began in 1931, and in 1936 the north section of the Hel Peninsula was officially declared the Hel Fortified Area (Helski Rejon Umocniony). Construction of the fortifications had not been finished before war broke out, but over several months, as tensions between Poland and Germany had mounted, the fortifications had been reinforced with provisional earthworks.

The Hel Fortified Area had coastal (anti-ship) and anti-aircraft artillery batteries. The Coastal Artillery Division's coastal batteries comprised battery of four 152 mm (6-inch) guns, two older batteries of two 105 mm (4.1-inch) guns, and three batteries of eight 75 mm (3-inch) guns. The 2nd Naval Anti-aircraft Artillery Division's anti-aircraft batteries were equipped with six 75 mm and eight 40 mm (1.6-inch) guns, seventeen machine guns, and two 120 cm (47-inch) searchlights. Infantry cover for the Hel Fortified Area was provided by a Border Defense Corps (KOP) unit – the Hel KOP Battalion under Major Jan Wiśniewski – which had several artillery pieces (four 75 mm, and six 37 mm), sixty-two machine guns, and two large and nine small mortars. The Coastal Artillery Division was 162 soldiers strong, the 2nd Naval Anti-aircraft Artillery Division numbered 1,000 personnel, and the KOP battalion, 1,197.

Overall command of the Hel Fortified Area was held by Rear Admiral Włodzimierz Steyer. However, Hel also became headquarters for the Polish Navy's commander, Rear Admiral Józef Unrug, who relocated his command center there on the eve of the invasion, on 31 August 1939, concluding that the Hel Fortified Area was better suited to prolonged defense than the more provisional defenses around his peacetime headquarters in Gdynia. Unrug also reinforced the Hel garrison with soldiers from his Gdynia garrison.

In September 1939, some 2,800 soldiers were stationed in the Hel Fortified Area. While the Hel coastal batteries were the strongest in Poland, they were inadequate to confront the German Navy and posed no great threat to any of the German capital ships. Likewise, the Polish air-defense batteries in the region were too few and too light to deter enemy aircraft, and the Naval Air Squadron's planes tasked with defending the area, stationed at the nearby town of Puck, were both older than their German counterparts and outnumbered by about ten to one.

== Battle ==
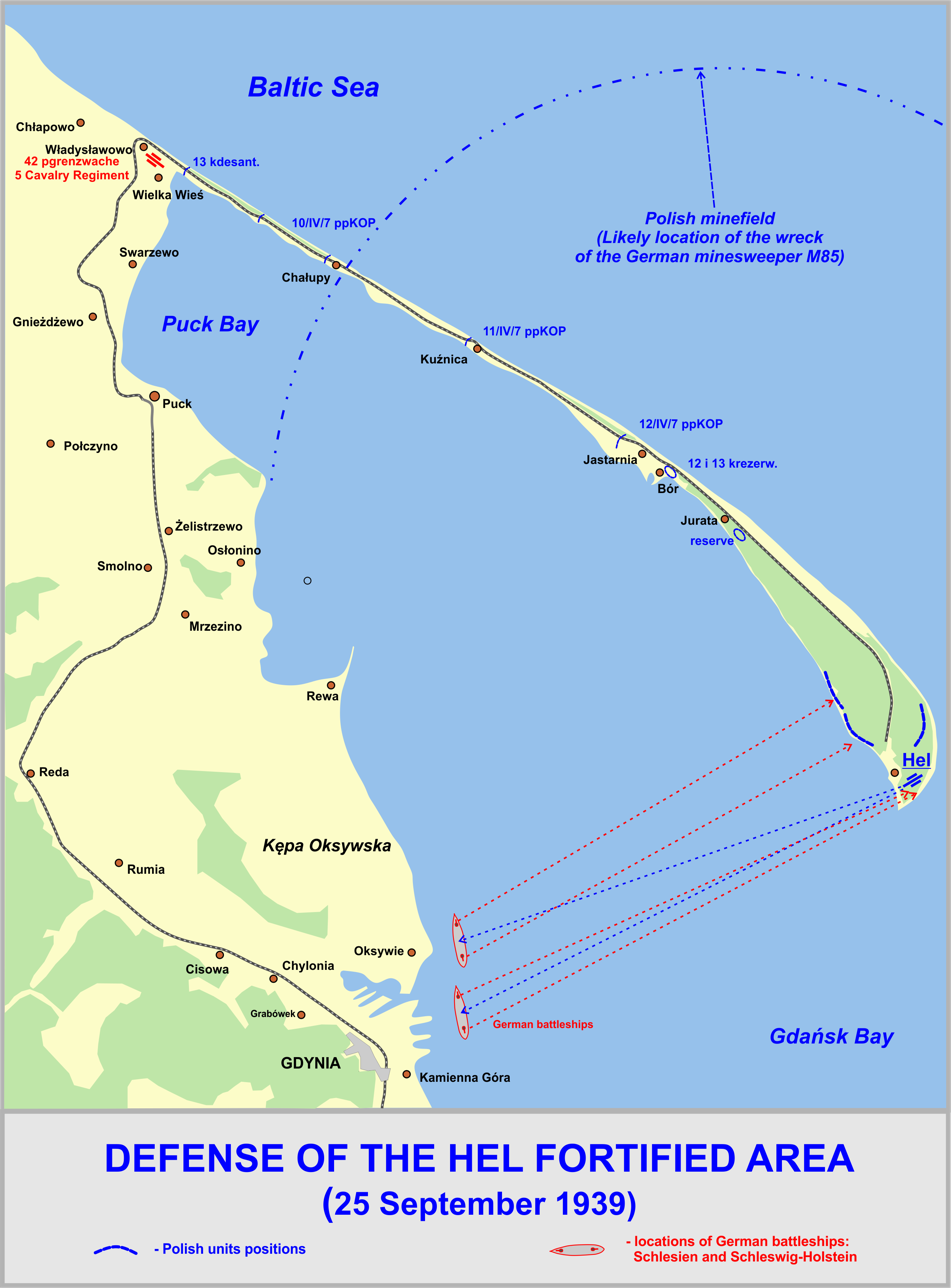
Map showing battle on 25 September 1939

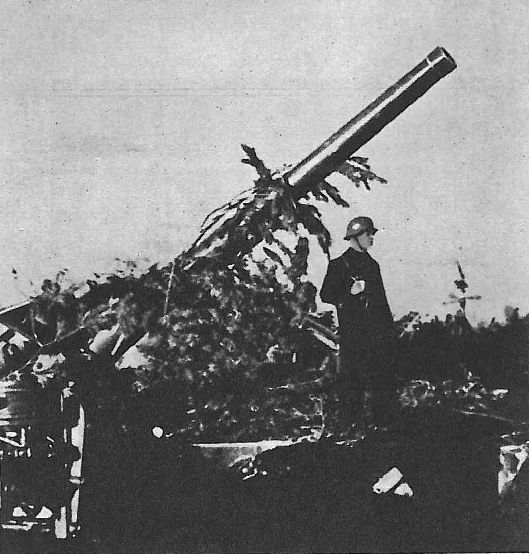
Polish 75 mm anti-aircraft gun at the Battle of Hel

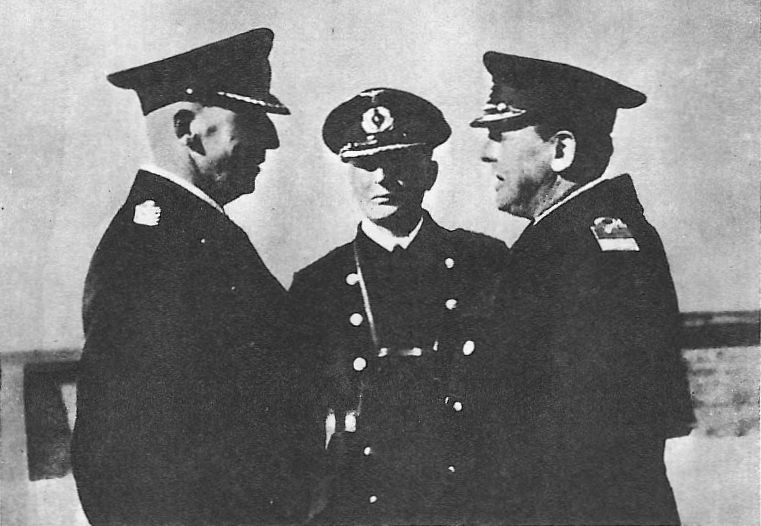
Capitulation of Hel, 1 or 2 October 1939. Polish Commodore Stefan Frankowski (right), German Admiral Hubert Schmundt (left)

Hel was attacked by the German Luftwaffe from the first day of the invasion. The first air raid occurred at 13:30, 1 September 1939, targeting the Polish coastal batteries. The second air raid, the same day at 18:00, targeted ships in the port, damaging the Polish light minelayer ORP Mewa. Further air raids occurred the following day. On 3 September, the Polish destroyer ORP Wicher and large minelayer ORP Gryf, supported by Polish coastal-battery fire, engaged two German destroyers, Z1 Leberecht Maass and Z9 Wolfgang Zenker. The Polish coastal battery also participated in this battle. This was the only surface naval engagement of the September Campaign and was relatively inconsequential. The German destroyer Z1 Leberecht Maass sustained light damage and four fatalities. The Polish Gryf also sustained light damage, with seven fatalities. The German ships retreated, and later that day the Luftwaffe sank the ORP Gryf, the ORP Wicher, as well as the ORP Mewa, the Polish gunboat ORP General Haller sustained heavy damage, was abandoned, and sank on 6 September. The Polish gunboat ORP Komendant Piłsudski, though largely undamaged, was also abandoned. This effectively eliminated the already heavily outnumbered surface Polish Navy as a fighting force on the Baltic Sea, with only several light units remaining operational in the theater.^{c} The surviving crews of the sunken Polish vessels joined the garrison's defenders, and two 120 mm guns from ORP Gryf were salvaged for shore-battery use.

In the first week of September, the Wehrmacht forced Polish Armia Pomorze units to retreat from the Danzig Corridor and, having captured Puck, on 9 September began assaulting the Polish forces on the Hel Peninsula. The advancing German forces included the 42nd Border Guard Regiment and the 5th Cavalry Regiment. Polish forces started a slow retreat toward the port of Hel on the Peninsula. On 10 September the Germans captured the village of Swarzewo, and on 11 September the town of Władysławowo near the base of the Peninsula. The Polish defenders fortified the next village, Chałupy, about a fifth of the way up the Peninsula. The Germans, having bottled up the Polish units on the Peninsula, did not launch major land operations until month's end.

On the night of 12/13 September 1939, the remaining Polish light minelayers laid a minefield near Hel. The following day, the Luftwaffe sank the Polish light minelayers ORP Jaskółka and ORP Czapla at the port of Jastarnia, while the remaining minelayers, ORP Czajka, ORP Rybitwa, and ORP Żuraw, were damaged. In view of German superiority on the Baltic Sea, the remaining Polish naval units docked at the Hel port and their crews joined the ground forces. The ships' armaments were stripped and converted into additional land-gun emplacements.

Heavier German naval units, namely the old Deutschland-class battleships Schleswig-Holstein and Schlesien, shelled the Hel Peninsula, to little effect. Schleswig-Holstein began shelling Polish positions at Hel and Redłowo (on the other side of the Vistula Lagoon, site of the battle of Gdynia) after the Polish garrison at Westerplatte surrendered on 7 September. These operations lasted until 13 September. Schlesien returned to bombarding Polish positions at Jastarnia and Hel from September 21. Between 25 and 27 September, the Schleswig-Holstein joined her sister ship at Hel again. On 25 September it was lightly damaged by Polish coastal batteries. Throughout that time, a number of air raids targeted the Hel Fortified Area as well. The Polish anti-aircraft batteries proved highly effective, shooting down between 46 and 53 German aircraft.

Henry Steele Commager writes that the Germans, after initially being stalled by Polish defenses, brought up land-artillery batteries and an armored train battery to support their barrage. According to Commager, German forces slowly advanced, still facing substantial resistance and counterattacks, and on 25 September, after the Germans took the village of Chałupy, Polish military engineers detonated torpedo warheads at the Peninsula's narrowest part, temporarily transforming the Peninsula's far end into an island.

A somewhat different account appears in the Polish-language Poland's Battles, 1939–1945: an Encyclopedic Guide, edited by Krzysztof Komorowski. The chapter on the Battle of Hel states that no substantial land engagements took place until 28 September, when German units slowly advanced toward Chałupy. In this account, the major German push took place on 30 September 1939. The German units assigned to take Hel, the 374th Infantry Regiment and the 207th Light Artillery Regiment, captured Chałupy on 30 September, and shortly afterward the Poles detonated the torpedo warheads – but the resulting damage was "less than expected", though it wrecked the Peninsula's railroad line.

On 1 October 1939 the Polish Navy's commander, Rear Admiral Józef Unrug, taking into account that the Polish outpost was running out of supplies and that no relief force would be coming, and in view of low troop morale, with two mutiny attempts having been quelled on 29 and 30 September, gave orders to capitulate. Some Polish soldiers attempted to flee across the Baltic Sea to Sweden on the remaining light craft and civilian vessels, but most were unsuccessful. The Germans occupied the Hel Peninsula by 2 October.

Some accounts of the Battle of Hel report the sinking on 1 October of the German minesweeper M85 by a mine near the Hel Peninsula, with 24 fatalities. The minefield had been laid by the Polish submarine ORP Żbik as part of Plan Sack. ORP Żbik and two other submarines, ORP Sęp and ORP Ryś – stationed at Hel – had gone to sea on 1 September.

== Aftermath ==
Polish battle casualties were light – some 50 dead and 150 wounded. About 3,600 Polish soldiers and sailors were taken prisoner. German losses were similar, estimated at a few dozen dead and wounded.^{d} Some remaining Polish light vessels, including light minelayers, gunboats, and noncombatant units such as tugboats, which were not sunk by air raids, may (sources vary) have been scuttled before the capitulation. Either way, most were either captured by the Germans or raised from the shallow waters and pressed into German service in subsequent weeks.

After Hel's surrender, the only organized military resistance in Poland was conducted by Independent Operational Group Polesie, which capitulated after the Battle of Kock on 5 October 1939, marking the end of organized resistance to the German invasion.

Some of the fortifications of Hel survived, and are currently tourist attractions. One of Hel's four 152 mm Bofors batteries from Heliodor Laskowski's Artillery Battery is now on display at the Polish Army Museum in Warsaw. The Battle of Hel appears among the battles inscribed on the Tomb of the Unknown Soldier in Warsaw.

== Notes ==
- This includes troops initially deployed at the Battle of Kępa Oksywska.
- Capitulation negotiations began the night of 30 September/1 October 1939. Ceasefire orders were issued the following day, and on 2 October 1939 the Polish troops were taken prisoner-of-war by the German force that occupied the Region.
- Three other large surface ships of the Polish Navy, destroyers ORP Błyskawica, ORP Burza and ORP Grom, were successfully evacuated shortly before the war started to British ports, following the contingency Peking Plan.
- It is unclear whether these estimates include any fatalities among German aircraft personnel downed by Hel air defenses, or fatalities among naval personnel on the two sides. German destroyer Z1 suffered 4 dead and 4 wounded in the engagement with Hel defenders on 3 September. Polish minelayer Gryf suffered 7 fatalities during the naval engagement. All Polish naval units also suffered some further fatalities from the air raids. German minesweeper M85 was sunk in a nearby minefield with 24 fatalities.

== See also ==
- Heliodor Laskowski's Artillery Battery No. 31
- Hel Fortified Area
- List of World War II military equipment of Poland
- List of German military equipment of World War II
