= Battle of Danzig Bay =

1939 World War II battle

- Part of Invasion of Poland
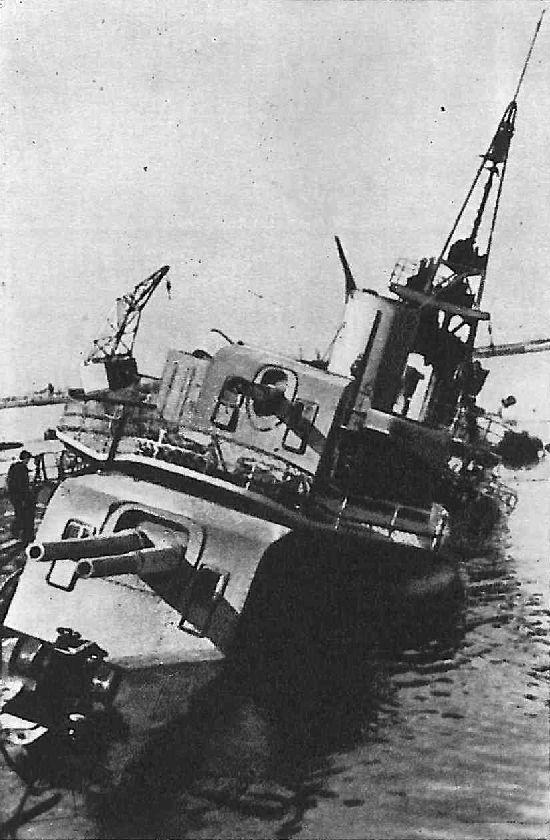
- Wreck of ORP Gryf
Date	1 September 1939
Location	Danzig Bay, Baltic Sea
Result	German victory: Cancellation of Operation Rurka

Belligerents
Germany	Poland

Commanders and leaders
Unknown	Stefan de Walden; Stefan Kwiatkowski †; Viktor Lomidze

Strength
33 Junkers Ju 87B	1 destroyer ORP Wicher; 1 minelayer ORP Gryf; 5 minesweepers 2 gunboats AA units at Hel Peninsula

Casualties and losses
7–10 aircraft destroyed or damaged	52 killed and wounded 1 minelayer and 1 minesweeper damaged

The Battle of Danzig Bay (Polish: bitwa w Zatoce Gdańskiej) took place on 1 September 1939, at the beginning of the invasion of Poland, when Polish Navy warships were attacked by German Luftwaffe aircraft in Gdańsk Bay (then Danzig Bay). It was the first naval-air battle of World War II.

== Background ==
The Polish Navy of the Second Polish Republic (1919–39) was prepared mostly as means of supporting naval communications with France in case of a war with the Soviet Union. After it became apparent that the aggressor would be Germany, and the entrance to the Baltic Sea would be blocked, three out of the four Polish modern destroyers were withdrawn from the Baltic Sea to Great Britain in what was called Operation Peking. The remaining forces, consisting of one large minelayer, one destroyer, five submarines and smaller vessels were to execute two major naval operations, both aimed at disrupting the German naval movement in the area of the Danzig Bay and transit movement between Germany and East Prussia. All submarines were dispatched for their operational zones in the southern Baltic to take part in the Worek Plan, an attempt to defend the Polish coast against possible German landings.

== Prelude ==
All the remaining surface vessels were to be dispatched from the naval base in Gdynia to Hel Peninsula, from where they were to start the so-called Operation Rurka. The plan was to lay a naval mine barrier between Hel Peninsula and Danzig to prevent any enemy ship from entering the area.

At dusk ten Polish warships left Gdynia for Hel, located on the other side of the bay. There, the ships were to start the minelaying operation. They were as follows: large minelayer Gryf, minelaying minesweepers Jaskółka, Czapla, Żuraw, Czajka, Rybitwa and Mewa, and gunboats Komendant Piłsudski and General Haller. The destroyer ORP Wicher had left for its position earlier that day and did not partake in the battle.

That afternoon a German reconnaissance aircraft spotted Gryf. Within half an hour a German airstrike was organized and launched, decisively destroying the minelayer via Stuka bombers.

== Battle ==
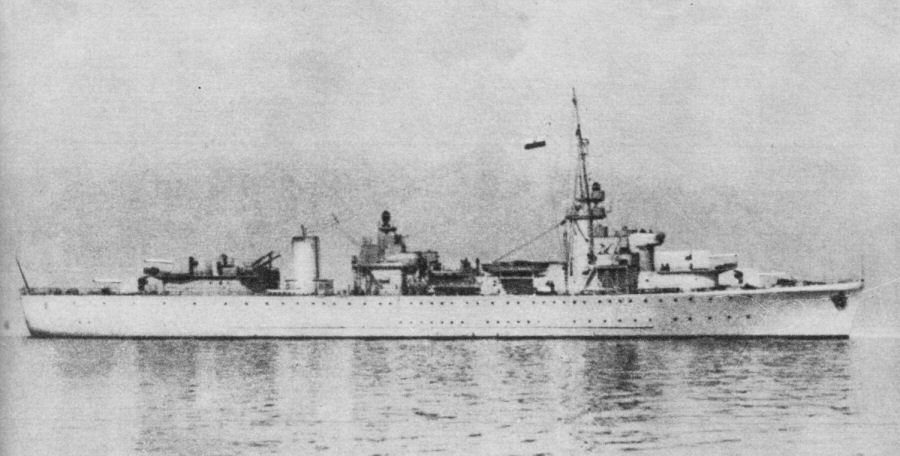
Polish minelayer ORP Gryf

While traversing Danzig Bay, the flotilla was surprised by a group of 33 German warplanes, mostly Junkers Ju 87B Stuka dive bombers. The German aircraft divided themselves into two groups and attacked. The Polish ships zig-zagged wildly to avoid being hit. Concentrated AA fire forced the planes to bomb from a higher altitude. The air raid was mostly unsuccessful and the Polish vessels suffered only minor losses. The backbone of the Polish flotilla, ORP Gryf with over 300 naval mines on board, remained unharmed.

However, soon after the first air raid was repelled, the German bombers returned, around 18:00. There were no direct hits, but two Polish minelayers suffered damage from near misses and machine gun fire: ORP Gryf and ORP Mewa. A near miss disabled Mewa, killing or wounding her 22 crewmen, so that she had to be taken in tow by ORP Rybitwa. The commanding officer of ORP Gryf, Cmdr. Stefan Kwiatkowski, was killed by German machine gun fire, 29 of his men were wounded, and his ship's rudder was jammed. Gryf's executive officer, Lt. Cmdr. Wiktor Łomidze assumed command. Fearing that her cargo of 300 mines was a liability, he ordered the munitions be thrown overboard.

== Aftermath ==
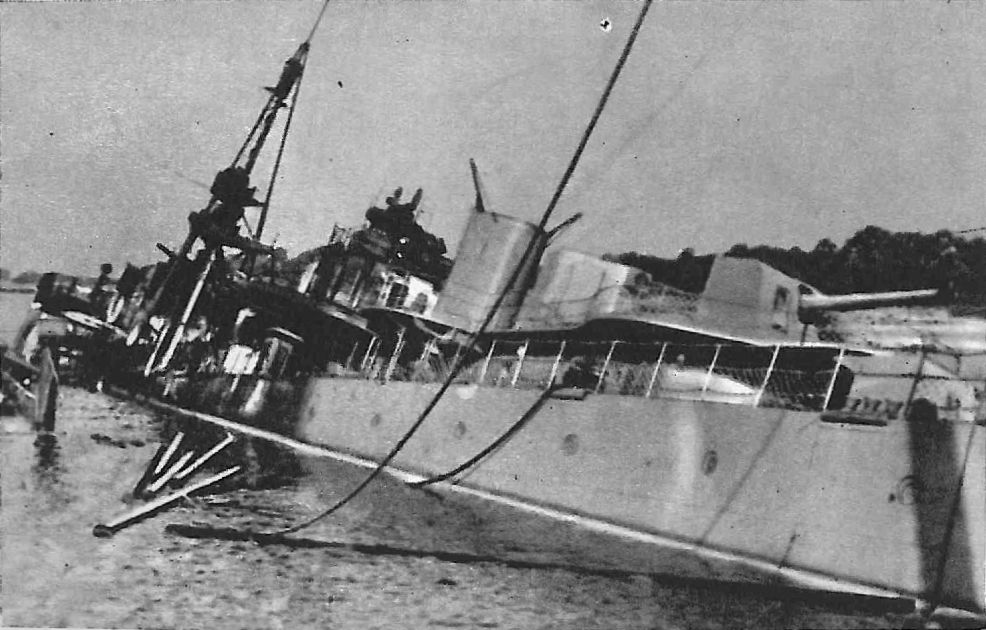
Sunken ORP Gryf

After the air raids, the Polish flotilla arrived at Hel. However, since ORP Gryf had abandoned all of its mines and was damaged, Operation Rurka had to be called off. ORP Wicher, did not receive the orders calling off the operation and went straight to the pre-designated zone of operations to cover the minelayers. At night, Wicher, commanded by Lt. Cdr. Stefan de Walden, spotted two German destroyers, and later a ship misidentified as a light cruiser, but did not attack, not wanting to compromise the operation.

After return to Hel Peninsula, Wicher and Gryf were stripped of most of their equipment, and served as anti-aircraft platforms in the Hel naval base.

== See also ==
- Polish Navy
- Luftwaffe
- Worek Plan

== Sources ==
- (in Polish) Jerzy Pertek, Wielkie dni małej floty, Poznań, 1976.
