= Viktor Lomidze =

Georgian-Polish military officer

Viktor Lomidze (7 February 1900 – June 1956), also known by his Polish name of Wiktor Łomidze-Wachtang, was a Georgian-Polish military officer.

== Biography ==
Lomidze was born in 1900 in the city of Ganja, Russian Empire (present-day Azerbaijan). After the Bolshevik take-over of his country, he emigrated to Poland in 1921, where he joined the Polish Army and then the Polish Navy.

In the 1920s and early 1930s, he held various positions in the Polish Navy and served as a deputy commander on several warships, including ORP Warszawa and ORP Rybitwa, and as the commander of ORP Kujawiak. Between 1935 and 1939, he was the commanding officer (in the rank of lieutenant-commander) of ORP Jaskółka, a Polish minesweeper and minelayer. Shortly before the outbreak of the war, he became the deputy commander of the ORP Gryf.

At the outbreak of the Polish Defensive War of 1939, on September 1 Gryf left the naval base at Gdynia with other Polish warships for the Operation Rurka, a failed attempt to lay a minefield at the entrances to the Gdańsk Bay. After boarding naval mines from a floating depot, the flotilla headed for Hel Peninsula, assisted by ORP Wicher and several smaller vessels (among them Łomidze's former ship Jaskółka). En route, she was attacked by a squadron of 33 German Ju 87B dive bombers and hit with several bombs. Although the damages were minor, the ship lost 22 sailors, including commander Stefan Kwiatkowski in what became known as the Battle of the Gdańsk Bay. Kwiatkowski's duties were taken over by his deputy Vikor Lomidze, who decided to throw all unarmed naval mines overboard, as he feared that during the next attack, the Gryf would be doomed if hit by a bomb. This meant that the mining operation had to be abandoned. This decision, which was made against Lomidze's orders and against the opinion of his crew, cost captain Łomidze his command of the ship, as he was relieved of his duties upon returning it to the port of Hel. The Gryf was sunk just two days later, on September 3, by German bombers in the port of Hel.

During the final days of the Polish defence of Pomerania, Lomidze, along with several other naval officers, crossed the Baltic on a small fishing cutter. They reached the port of Liepāja, from where Łomidze got to Sweden and then to the United Kingdom. He applied to the Polish Navy being reconstructed there by the Polish Government in Exile. Although he was admitted, he was also held responsible for the decision to throw away the mines back in September 1939, a decision that severely crippled the Polish defensive operations in the Baltic Sea. Because of that, and despite Lomidze's pleas, he was never again given a command over any Polish vessel. Instead, he spent the remainder of World War II on various staff duties. He finished his career in the rank of Commander.

He died in London in 1956. His grave is located in Brompton Cemetery, London.
