= Lech (1904) =

Polish Navy steam tugboat

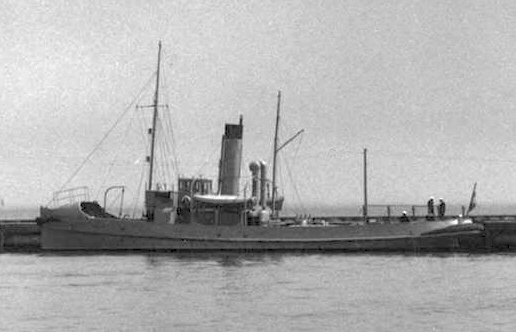
- Lech in 1932

History

German Empire
- Name: Hercules (1904); Brussa (1921)
- Builder: Schichau-Werke, Elbląg
- Launched: 1904
- Commissioned: 1904

History

Polish Merchant Navy
- Name: Krakus
- Commissioned: 1926

History

Polish Armed Forces
- Name: Lech
- Commissioned: 1930
- Decommissioned: September 14, 1939
- Fate: sunk

History

Polish People's Republic
- Name: Lech
- Commissioned: January 1, 1946
- Decommissioned: August 28, 1946

History

Polish People's Republic
- Name: BG-6 → H-6
- Commissioned: January 26, 1957
- Decommissioned: April 1, 1983

General characteristics
- Class & type: tugboat
- Displacement: 280 t (280 long tons)
- Length: 30.8 m (101 ft 1 in)
- Beam: 6.53 m (21 ft 5 in)
- Draft: 3.57 m (11 ft 9 in)
- Propulsion: triple-expansion steam engine, 450 hp
- Speed: 12 kn (22 km/h; 14 mph)
- Crew: 12

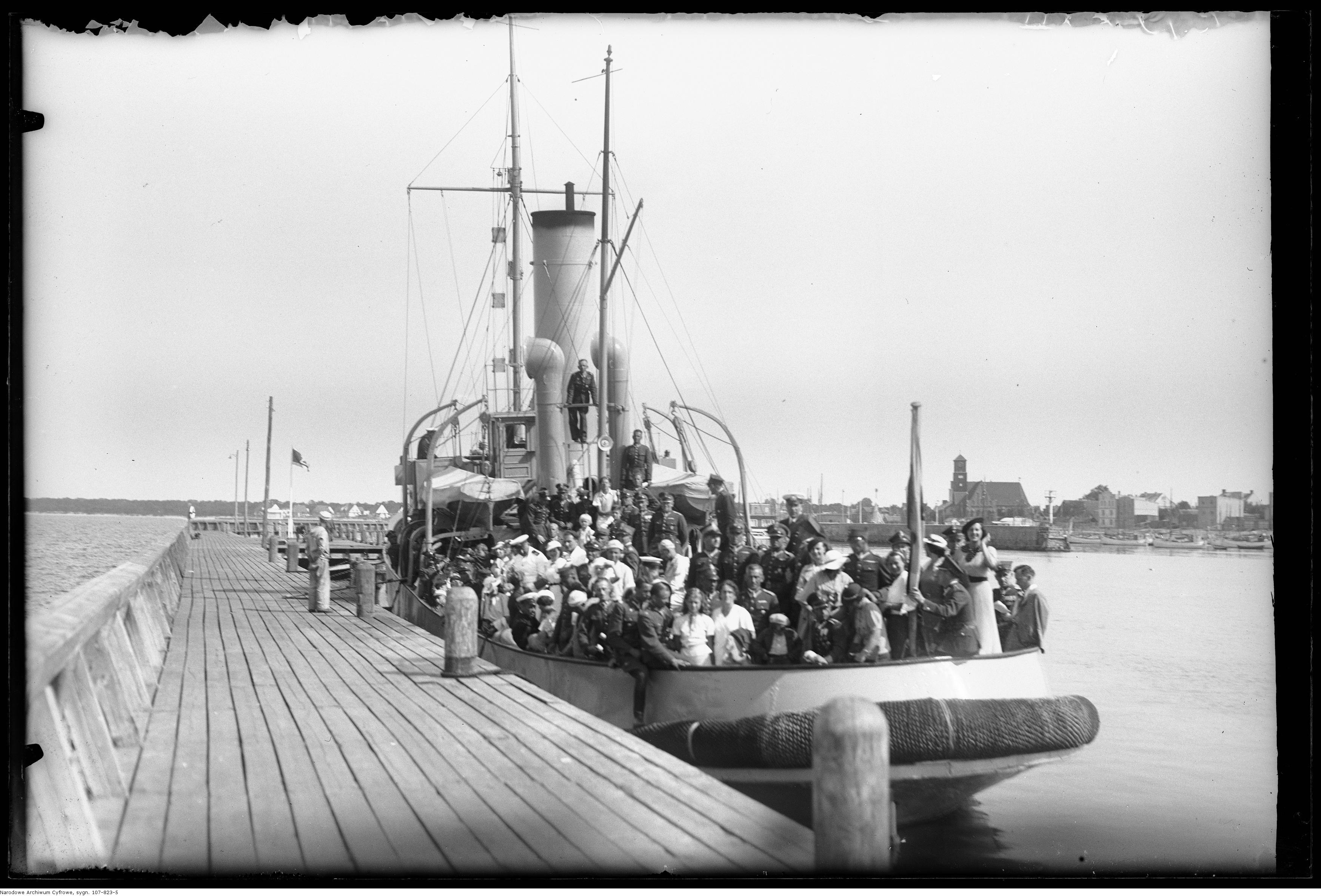
Lech in the port of Hel, July 1937

Lech was a steam-powered tugboat that served in the Polish Navy during the interwar period and, after World War II, until the 1980s under the designation H-6. Built in 1904, it initially operated under German shipowners as Hercules and Brussa, and later under the Polish shipowner Żegluga Wisła – Bałtyk as Krakus. It joined the Polish Navy in 1930 and was sunk during the 1939 September Campaign. After the war, it briefly returned to service in 1946 and, following a refit, resumed operations in 1957 as H-6. It was decommissioned in 1983, the last steam tugboat in the Polish Navy.

== Construction and description ==
Lech was constructed in 1904 at the Schichau-Werke shipyard in Elbląg, originally named Hercules. Its propulsion system featured a three-cylinder compound engine producing 450 horsepower (336 kW), driving a single propeller. Post-war, as H-6, the engine's output was reported as 500 horsepower. The tugboat achieved a speed of 12 knots.

The gross register tonnage was 159 GRT, though some sources report 149 GRT, with a displacement of 280 tonnes. Sources vary slightly on dimensions. Recent publications list a length of 30.8 m, beam of 6.53 m, and draught of 3.57 m, or a length of 30 m and beam of 6.5 m. Older sources cite an overall length of 32 m (30 m length between perpendiculars), beam of 7 m, and draught of 3.8 m.

== Service history ==
=== Civilian service ===
Before World War I, Hercules operated at the Schichau shipyard in Gdańsk. Some sources suggest it served in the Imperial German Navy (Kaiserliche Marine) from 1914 to 1916 before returning to shipyard duties. From 1920, as Brussa, it was owned by Deutsche Levante Linie in Hamburg, or, per other sources, from 1921 by HAPAG in Hamburg. From 1922 or 1923, it belonged to Bugsier-, Reederei- und Bergungs AG in Hamburg.

In November 1926, the tugboat was acquired by the newly formed Polish company Żegluga Wisła – Bałtyk in Tczew and operated as Krakus until 1928, towing lighters transporting coal from Tczew to Baltic ports.

=== Polish Navy service until 1939 ===
In December 1928, the Polish Navy purchased the tugboat from the failing shipowner. After modernization, it entered service in 1930 as Lech within the Training Squadron. It was the largest and most powerful tugboat in the Polish Navy at the time, stationed at the Oksywie naval base. It assisted in mooring maneuvers for large ships, towed artillery targets in the Gdańsk Bay, and was assigned to the training ship ORP Mazur. It also supported the torpedo range, transported troops to Westerplatte, and, with ice-strengthened hulls, broke ice during winter.

At the outbreak of World War II, Lech was the only tugboat assigned to the Land Coastal Defence under Colonel Stanisław Dąbek. Commanded by Senior Boatswain Stanisław Woiński, it left Oksywie on 1 September 1939 during a German bombardment, heading to Jastarnia with other vessels. There, it supported mine-laying barges in the Kuźnica Bay, some of which were former Żegluga Wisła – Bałtyk lighters. On 14 September 1939, German Junkers Ju 87 dive-bombers from 4./Trägergruppe 186 sank Lech in Jastarnia port, along with ORP Mewa, ORP Czapla, and ORP Jaskółka.

Its wartime fate remains unclear. Older sources reported its fate as unknown, while it was likely salvaged by the Germans, though no record of its use exists. Unconfirmed reports suggest it survived the war ashore at Oksywie.

=== Post-war service ===
According to recent findings, Lech was repaired and recommissioned into the Polish Navy on 1 January 1946, retaining its name. However, it sank during a storm in Gdynia's Basin No. 1 (Presidential) in July 1946 and was struck from the navy list on 28 August 1946.

Subsequently salvaged and extensively refitted, it was recommissioned on 26 January 1957 as BG-6 (replacing the tugboat Pionier). In July 1957, it was redesignated H-6 under new naming conventions. Its bridge was rebuilt before 1978. The tugboat was decommissioned on 1 April 1983, marking the end of steam-powered tugboats in the Polish Navy.

== Bibliography ==
- Danielewicz, Waldemar (1998). "Holowniki Polskiej Marynarki Wojennej w latach 1920–1997" [Tugboats of the Polish Navy 1920–1997]. Morza, Statki i Okręty (in Polish). 3 (12). ISSN 1426-529X.
- Miciński, Jerzy (1996). Księga statków polskich: 1918–1945 [Book of Polish Ships: 1918–1945] (in Polish). Vol. 1. Gdańsk: Polnord, Oskar. ISBN 83-86181-23-0.
