= ORP Czapla =

Polish minesweeper

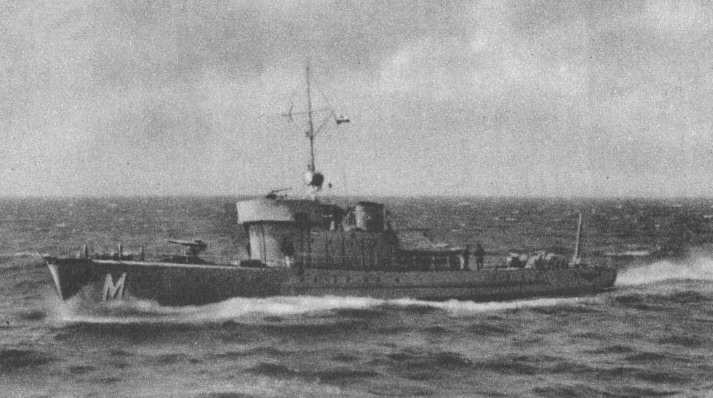
- Twin unit of Czapla – ORP Mewa

History

Poland
- Name: ORP Czapla
- Builder: Polish Navy Shipyard, Gdynia
- Laid down: 1937
- Launched: August 22, 1938
- Commissioned: August 31, 1939
- Decommissioned: September 14, 1939
- Fate: unknown

General characteristics
- Class & type: Jaskółka-class minesweeper
- Displacement: standard: 183 t (180 long tons); full: 203 t (200 long tons)
- Length: 45 m (147 ft 8 in)
- Draft: 1.55 m (5 ft 1 in)
- Propulsion: 2 eight-cylinder diesel engines with a total power of 1,050 hp
- Speed: 18 kn (33 km/h; 21 mph)
- Complement: 27–30
- Armament: 1 x 75 mm Schneider gun (model 1897); 2 x 13.2 mm machine guns; 2 x 7.92 mm machine guns; 20 naval mines; 20 depth charges

ORP Czapla was a Polish coastal minesweeper of the Jaskółka class, referred to as a mine layer according to the nomenclature used in the Navy of the Second Polish Republic. It was built in Poland at the Polish Navy Shipyard in Gdynia as a ship of the second series of Jaskółka-class minesweeper. It was the first of three ships of this name in the Polish Navy. Although incomplete, it participated in the September campaign, during which it was sunk by German aircraft in the fishing port of Jastarnia. It was raised by the Germans, and its subsequent fate is unknown.

== Order and construction ==
The Leadership of the Polish Navy, in implementing the accepted program to increase the strength of the naval fleet, decided to continue the expansion of mine warfare vessels. Even during the construction of the first series of minesweepers, the head of the Polish Navy Shipyard in Gdynia, Commander Witold Szulc, requested on 7 December 1935 from the Chief of the Technical Service of the Leadership of the Polish Navy permission to build a tugboat with a power of 300 hp or two additional minesweepers. The four small minesweepers built between 1933 and 1936 were suitable only for coastal service, which is why plans were made to construct larger, ocean-going vessels with a displacement of 300 tons. Despite plans and savings of 200,000 PLN from the construction of the first four vessels, the Leadership of the Polish Navy was unable to secure the necessary funding, leading to the decision to build two additional, slightly modified vessels of the first series.

Considering the positive experiences in the construction and operation of the "little birds", it was decided to build the new ships at the Polish Navy Shipyard in Gdynia. The contract for their construction was signed on 14 August 1937 by the Chief of the Technical Service of the Naval Port Command in Gdynia and the head of the Polish Navy Shipyard, with construction of the vessel beginning in the autumn of that year. The ship was to be built according to the same plans as the first series vessels, but with certain modifications. Waterproof doors were installed in the bulkhead separating the forward crew compartments from the officers' cabins. This change was prompted by experiences from operated vessels, where high storm waves made it impossible to enter the crew areas. The head of the Leadership of the Polish Navy approved this on 25 March 1938. In the new vessel, the hydrostatic (depth charge) compartments were exchanged with the ammunition chamber, and modifications were made to the fuel venting system, reducing the refueling time by 10 minutes. A steel cover for the bridge (instead of a canvas one) was also added.

In building the minesweepers, efforts were made to maximize the reduction of supplies from foreign companies and replace them with products from the domestic industry. However, the local industry lacked experience, resulting in protracted negotiations and delays in order fulfillment. The engines were to be supplied by the Engine and Armature Factory PZInż., the same company that provided engines for the first series vessels. A relevant agreement was signed on 4 August 1937. Acceptance trials for the engines took place from 5 to 16 July 1938. During these trials, the Acceptance Commission, chaired by Captain Engineer Michał Gierżod, with members Engineer Marceli Leśniczak and Engineer Czesław Śladkowski, identified several defects – far more than those found in the engines for the first series. The head of the Polish Navy Shipyard, Engineer Szulc, completed all the orders needed to finish the vessel only in October 1938. Significant time and quality issues also arose in the production of direct current generators, supplied by the Rohn-Zieliński S. A. company from Żychlin. The fulfillment of the order was significantly delayed, and additionally, the generators had a lower power than ordered. In January 1939, the Acceptance Commission conditionally accepted them, reducing their price. The vessel was launched on 22 August 1938 and began trials in 1939.

== Construction ==
ORP Czapla had an overall length of 45 meters, while the waterline length was 43 meters. The maximum width of the ship was 5.5 meters, and the draft at a standard displacement of 183 tons was 1.55 meters. The vessel had a flush deck hull made of shipbuilding steel. From the bow to amidships, there was a superstructure, behind which was a funnel. Due to the placement of long mine rails, the ship did not have a deck overhang, so a rise was added in the bow to improve seaworthiness. To enhance the vessel's maritime characteristics and facilitate mine sweeping operations, the stern of the minesweeper was wide, allowing for the installation of two screw shafts. To improve stability amidships, stabilizers were installed. The construction of the minesweeper was mostly riveted, although some elements were welded.

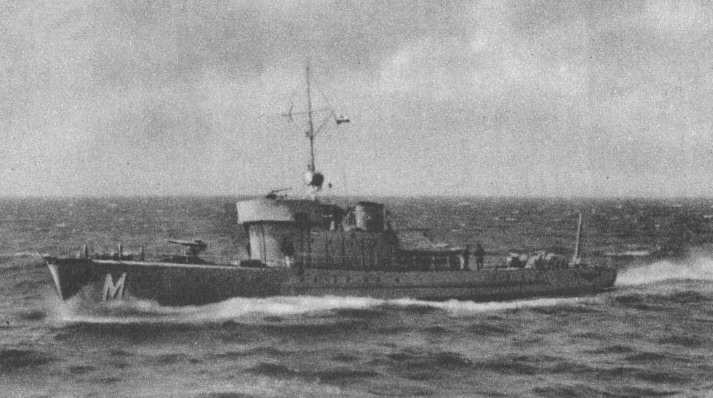
ORP Mewa in 1937 had a similar silhouette to ORP Czapla

The propulsion system consisted of two straight-eight Nohab diesel engines manufactured at the Ursus SA factory in Warsaw. Each engine had a power of 525 hp and drove a separate propeller shaft. The total power of the engines was 1,050 hp, allowing for a maximum speed of 18 knots. The engines powered two propellers from the German company Theodor Zeise from Altona. Auxiliary systems were electrically powered by three generator sets driven by diesel engines with a total power of approximately 120 hp. The voltage in the ship's electrical network was 220 V. The minesweeper was equipped with a six-oared ship's boat and had a radio transmitter and receiver of the RKM/K type, as well as a transceiver station of the Z-32 type. Swedish-produced rudder deflection indicators were also installed. The crew consisted of 27 to 30 personnel.

The main armament of the vessel was to be a 75 mm Canon Ml1928 gun, purchased on 18 August 1938 in France; however, it did not arrive in Poland before the outbreak of the war. Consequently, the ship was armed with a French 75 mm field gun. For air defense, the ship was to be equipped with a twin Hotchkiss 13.2 mm machine gun, which was planned to be mounted amidships, but it was not installed before the war broke out. The air defense was supplemented with two MG 08 heavy machine guns in caliber 7.92 mm, positioned on special side platforms on the superstructure, on both sides of the funnel. The ship was equipped with two mine rails, on which it could transport and deploy 20 08-type contact mines. The minesweeper was also adapted for laying SM-5 mines used on Wilk-class submarines. The vessel had the capability to carry 20 depth charges for anti-submarine warfare. Their detection was facilitated by British Hughes noise detectors. The mine sweeping equipment included two Renar sweeps and one towed sweep, which was used in conjunction with another minesweeper. Four davits and a sweep winch were placed at the stern for handling the sweeps.

== Service ==
The tense political situation led to the partially equipped vessel being commissioned into service at the end of August 1939. The exact date of its official entry into service is unknown. On August 26, ORP Czapla was included in the Minesweeper Division, but problems with the steering engine, the electrical system of the rudder, and the overheating left engine rendered it not fully operational as a combat ship. The first commander of the ship, appointed on June 25 during its construction, was Lieutenant Commander Tadeusz Rutkowski, who served until July 8, when he was succeeded by Lieutenant Commander Eligiusz Ceceniowski. The crew was hastily assembled, mostly consisting of reservists.

Commanders of the vessel
Lieutenant Commander Tadeusz Rutkowski	25 June 1939	8 July 1939
Lieutenant Commander Eligiusz Ceceniowski	8 July 1939	2 September 1939

On 1 September 1939, the ship was in the naval port at Oksywie. At 5:20 AM, three German Heinkel He 60 seaplanes flew over the port. They were not immediately identified due to the thick fog that morning. After receiving orders, the gun and anti-aircraft crews opened fire, but it was ineffective as the enemy aircraft were out of range. The minesweeper, along with the other vessels in the division, moved out to the roadstead. Around 2 PM, it participated in repelling a German air raid on Gdynia. At 3 PM, a meeting took place on ORP Wicher to discuss the planned mine-laying operation codenamed Rurka. According to the plan, from 1 to 2 September, the minelayer ORP Gryf was to lay a minefield along the Hel–Sopot line, and the minesweepers were to occupy protective sectors at 10 PM. For this purpose, Czapla, along with the other minesweepers, two gunboats, the destroyer ORP Wicher, and the minelayer ORP Gryf, proceeded to the area of Hel port.

Before 6 PM, three nautical miles from the port of Hel, the group of Polish ships was attacked by Junkers Ju 87 dive bombers. 33 aircraft concentrated their attack on the largest vessels, namely Wicher and Gryf. During the raid, problems with the steering gear of Czapla were revealed; the rudder got stuck, causing the vessel to start circling at full speed. The electrician was unable to fix the fault, and a specialist from ORP Żuraw was brought on board. After repelling the German attack and canceling Operation Rurka, Czapla remained in the roadstead of Hel port throughout the night from 1 to 2 September to be able to maneuver freely in case of an air attack. The next day, at 4 AM, on the order of Rear Admiral Józef Unrug, the vessel moved with the other minesweepers to Jastarnia. At 6 AM, three Ju 87B bombers attacked, firing on the vessels in port.

Due to steering issues, all armament was removed from the ship and placed in trenches. The 75 mm gun was positioned at the port entrance, while the 7.92 mm machine guns bolstered the port's air defense. The crew of Czapla was accommodated in boarding houses near the port and participated in the port's anti-air defense. The ship did not take part in further operations of the division.

On September 14, at 7:29 AM, German Ju 87B bombers from the 4th Squadron of the 186th Carrier Air Group, which was to operate from the aircraft carrier Graf Zeppelin (4.(St)/186(T)), carried out the first raid of the day on Jastarnia. As a result, the hydrographic vessel ORP Pomorzanin, the tugboat Lech, and ORP Czapla sank. One SC 250 bomb exploded near the bow, and another SC 50 detonated at the stern. The exploding bombs tore off the hull and created a hole in the side. The ship began to break apart and soon sank. On 16 December 1939, the vessel was raised by the Marine Bergungsgruppe Gotenhafen and subsequently towed to the Bay of Puck. The further fate of the vessel remains unknown.

== Bibliography ==
- Dyskant, Józef Wiesław (2000). Polska Marynarka Wojenna w 1939 roku, cz. 1: W przededniu wojny [The Polish Navy in 1939, Part 1: On the Eve of War] (in Polish). AJ-Press. ISBN 83-7237-044-3.
