= ORP Rybitwa =

Polish ship active during World War II

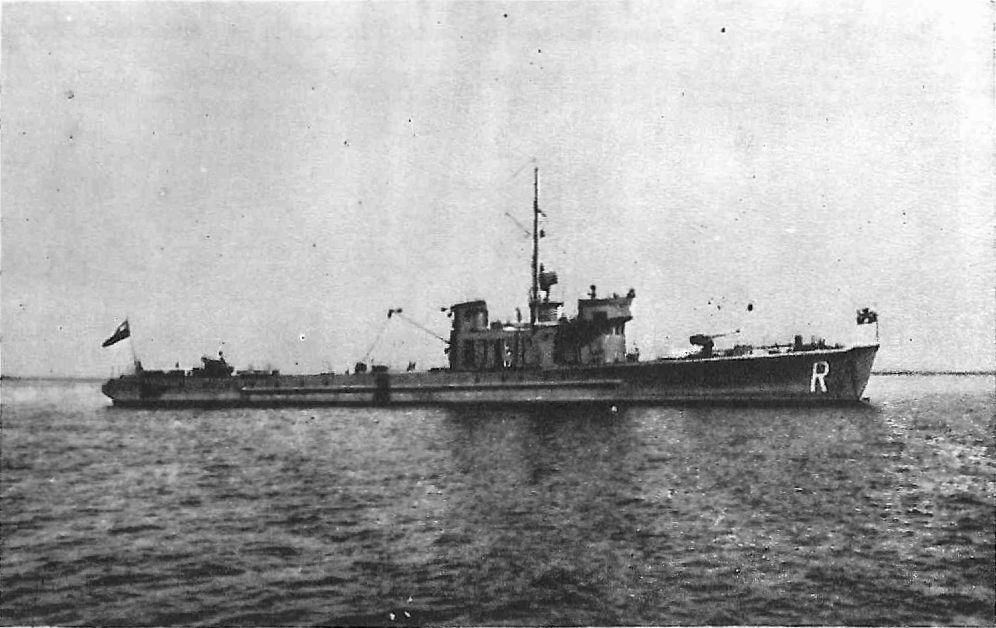

History

Poland
- Name: ORP Rybitwa
- Namesake: rybitwa, Polish word for "tern"
- Builder: Państwowa Stocznia Modlińska, Modlin
- Laid down: May 1933
- Launched: April 1935
- Commissioned: December 1935
- Stricken: 1972
- Fate: Scrapped 1972

General characteristics
- Class & type: Jaskółka-class minesweeper
- Displacement: 183 t standard
- Length: 45.0 m (147 ft 8 in)
- Beam: 5.5 m (18 ft 1 in)
- Propulsion: 2 × diesel engines, 1,050 hp (780 kW) total
- Speed: 17.5 knots (32.4 km/h; 20.1 mph)
- Armament: 1 × 75 mm; 2 × 7.92 mm machine guns; 20 mines or 20 depth charges

ORP Rybitwa was a Jaskółka-class minesweeper of the Polish Navy at the outset of World War II. Rybitwa participated in the defence of Poland during the Nazi German invasion of 1939. The ship was damaged by a German bomb on 14 September 1939. The ship was later captured by the Germans, but returned to serve under the Polish flag after the War.

== History ==
=== Construction ===
Rybitwa was constructed in the riverine dockyard in Modlin between 1933 and 1935. The first commander of the ship was Lieutenant Commander Jerzy Kossakowski. The ship was named after the bird tern, "Rybitwa" in Polish.

=== Service ===
Lieutenant Commander Kazimierz Miładowski was the captain of the ship during the September campaign. On 26 or 27 August Rybitwa, which together with two other Polish ships had been stationed in Riga, Latvia, left for Gdynia, along with ORP Czajka on full combat alert. After arriving in Gdynia she conducted reconnaissance operations in Gdańsk Bay, between the Free City of Danzig and the East Prussian coast. On 1 September 1939, after the outbreak of the Second World War, Rybitwa and all other 5 minesweepers of her class joined with the minelayer Gryf and took part in the Operation Rurka, an attempt to mine the entrances of the Gdańsk Bay.

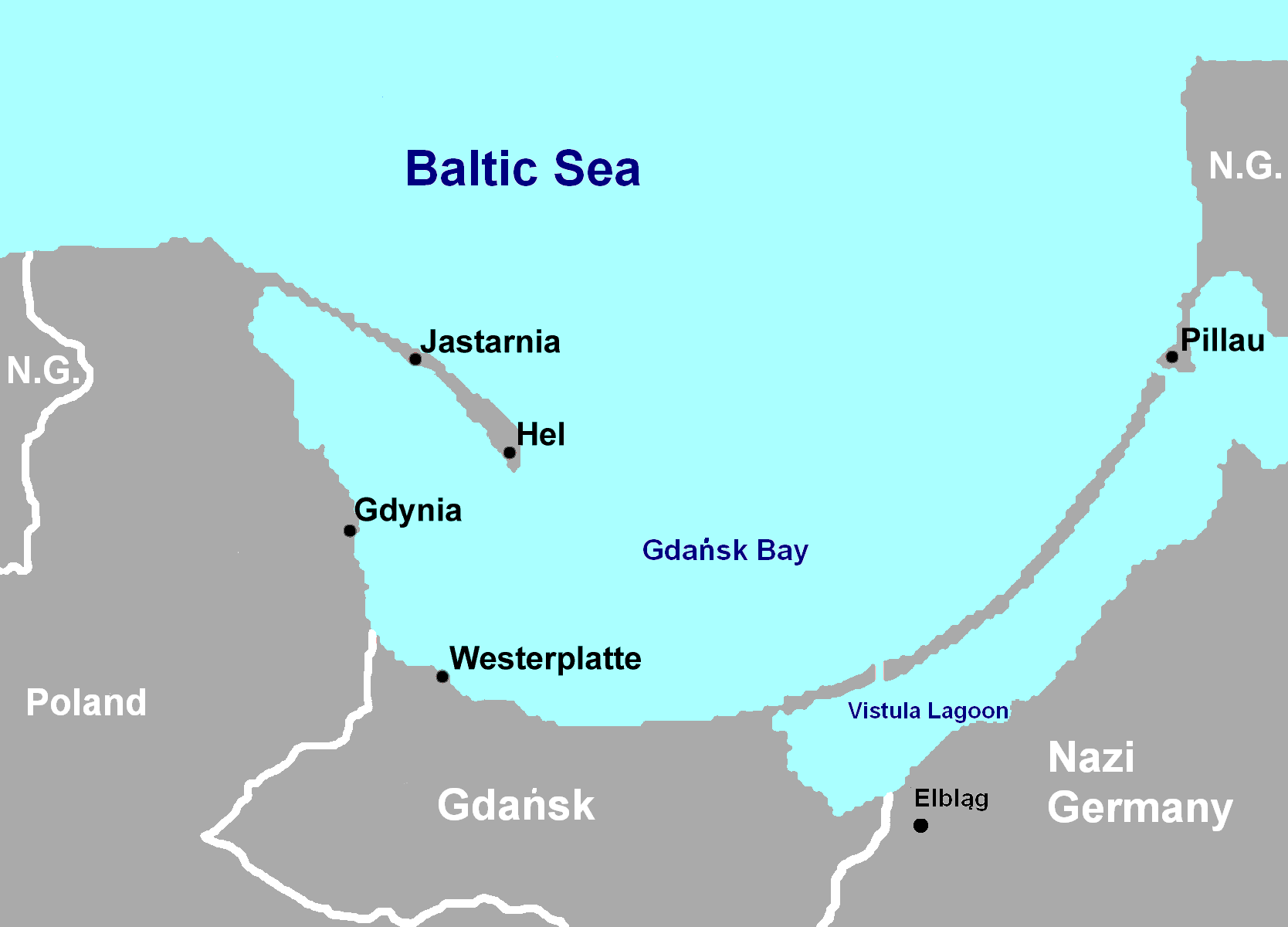
Polish ports of Gdynia, Hel and Jastarnia in 1939

The Polish flotilla, which included the destroyer Wicher and two gunboats, was attacked by a large formation of German bombers. Rybitwa's sister ship, Mewa, was hit. Despite the great risk involved, the captain of Rybitwa, Miładowski, made the decision to tow Mewa into port; the operation was a success. In the next few weeks, the ship was based at the port of Jastarnia and conducted patrols and mine laying operations at night, while defending the Hel Peninsula during the day. On 19 September, Rybitwa was damaged by bombs while still in port - most of the crew were not onboard at the time. In order to prevent capture by German troops, the ship was scuttled soon after. The Polish defense of Hel Peninsula lasted until 2 October. The Germans refloated the ship, renamed her Rixhöft and commissioned her into the Kriegsmarine. After the end of World War II the Polish naval mission in Germany found Rybitwa together with three of her sister ships in Travemünde. The Polish flag was raised again and her original name was restored. Though under British supervision, the German crew purposely destroyed much of their equipment but Polish sailors managed to make the ships seaworthy again and the ships returned to Poland.

Rybitwa served in various roles up to 1972 when she was finally decommissioned and scrapped.

== In popular culture ==
Rybitwa, along with other Polish ships of the Jaskółka class, is mentioned in the Günter Grass novella Cat and Mouse.
