= ORP Żuraw =

Minesweeper of the Polish Navy

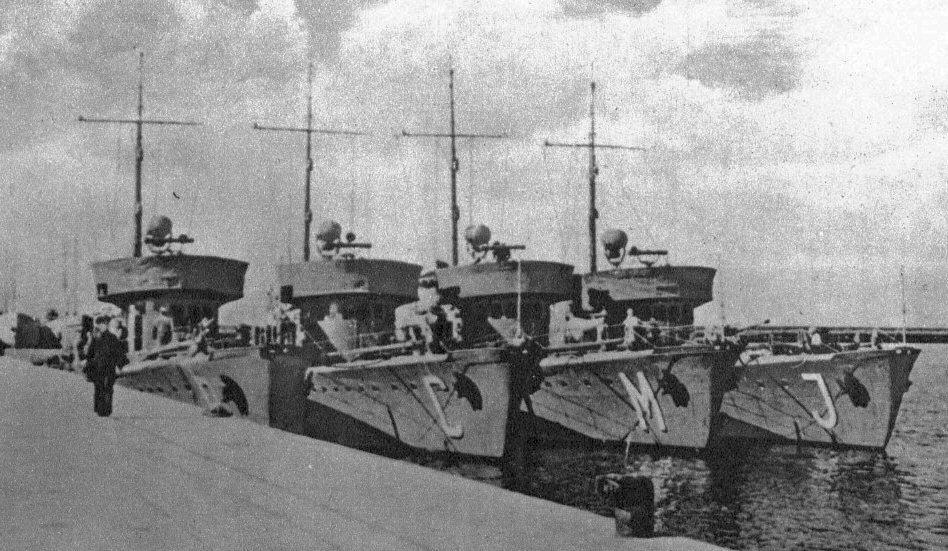
- ORP Żuraw

History

Poland
- Name: ORP Żuraw
- Builder: Polish Navy Shipyard (Stocznia Marynarki Wojennej), Gdynia
- Launched: 22 September 1938
- Fate: Captured by Nazi Germany, 2 October 1939

Nazi Germany
- Name: Oxhöft
- Acquired: Captured, 2 October 1939
- Fate: Surrendered 1945

Poland
- Name: ORP Żuraw
- Recommissioned: 25 January 1946
- Decommissioned: 1977
- Renamed: Kompas 1947; BK-4 1971
- Reclassified: Survey ship, 1948; Barracks ship, 1971
- Fate: Broken up 1981

General characteristics
- Class & type: Jaskółka-class minesweeper
- Displacement: 183 t standard
- Length: 45.0 m (147 ft 8 in)
- Beam: 5.5 m (18 ft 1 in)
- Propulsion: 2 × diesel engines, 1,050 hp (780 kW) total
- Speed: 17.5 knots (32.4 km/h; 20.1 mph)
- Armament: 1 × 75 mm; 2 × 7.92 mm machine guns; 20 mines or 20 depth charges

ORP Żuraw was a Jaskółka-class minesweeper of the Polish Navy at the outset of World War II. Her name is the Polish word for the common crane. Żuraw participated in the defense of Poland during the German invasion of 1939. The ship was surrendered to the Germans following the Polish capitulation and renamed Oxhöft as a naval trawler. Following the German surrender at the end of the war, the ship was returned to Poland under her old name. In 1947, Żuraw was modified for use as a hydrographical survey ship and renamed Kompas. She was broken up in 1981.

== Construction and career ==
Żuraw was built at the Polish Navy Shipyard (Stocznia Marynarki Wojennej) in Gdynia as a Jaskkóła-class warship minesweeper. She was named and launched on 22 September 1938.

The ship was rushed into service and developed problems with the steering gear, possibly because the ship was incomplete when it was put into service. She was under the command of Capt Mjr. Robert Kasperski and her homeport was at Jastarnia.

On 1 September 1939 the ship participated in the defense of the Hel Peninsula against a massive German aerial "carpet" bombing attack. On 14 September 1939, Żuraw was transferred to Hel, where the ship became part of the shoreline defense fleet. After the capitulation of the Hel Peninsula on 2 October 1939, the ship anchored at Hel harbor and was confiscated by the Germans. Following this, the ship was put in the service of Nazi Germany's Kriegsmarine under the new German name Oxhöft. She was initially placed in service as a trawling ship, then later converted to an auxiliary hydrographical survey ship.

Under the German Navy the ship underwent a retrofit with modifications of the middle section, and the guard of the fight ramp was also altered. Together with three other Polish Navy trawlers that survived the war (Mewa, Rybitwa, Czajka), Żuraw saw service as part of the auxiliary force of German trawlers.

After the war ended, the ships were recovered by the Polish Government at Travemünde and returned to service with the Polish Navy on 25 January 1946. At Travemünde, the Polish Flag was raised and the ship regained its former Polish name Żuraw. On or about 13 February 1946, she was transferred to Kilonia, where new armament (5 German 20 mm cannons) and trawling equipment were added.

On 12 March 1946, the trawlers, together with Żuraw returned to Gynia Harbor, where they commenced service as the 1st Division. The warships had a mark on their sides ŻW, which was later changed to ŻR. In 1946 Żuraw underwent an overhaul, and as the first of the class to return to service, began a mission on 1 November 1946 while temporarily assigned to a group of trawlers type MT. On 29 November 1946 the ship was assigned to Świnoujście, to join the Szczecin sub-naval region. Beginning in December 1946, the ship went on multiple deployments and hydrographical surveying. About 14 May 1947 Żuraw was permanently assigned to the Hydrographic Division of the Polish Navy at St. Kierzkowski and renamed Kompas. At the end of 1947 the ship underwent a modification and was retrofitted for new service, with the hydrographical survey and a design and drafting studio.

On or about 15 September 1948 Żuraw was officially reclassified and converted as a hydrographical survey ship with the identification mark: HG-11. She became the first hydrographical survey ship of the Polish Navy following the end of World War II.

On about 1 September 1951, 12 members from the crew took over the ship and rerouted the ship to the harbor of Ystad, Sweden, where they asked for political asylum to escape the newly formed communist regime in Poland. On 3 September 1951 the ship returned to Poland with the remaining crew. This event led to a series of political trials in the Polish Navy, which ended on or about 7 November 1951 with death penalty convictions in absentia for the escaped crew members. Some of the members of the crew who returned to Poland were also convicted and received the death penalty for allowing other crew members to escape from the communist state. The Polish government declared that this was an act of treason and put down the ships name and the ship was renamed Kompas. For the ship's remaining years of the service, she served as a hydrographical survey and measurements laboratory.

From 1959 to 1963 Kompas underwent a major retrofit at the Polish Navy Shipyard. At the end of December 1971 the ship was converted to a military hotel quarters barge BK-4 at Gdynia shipyard. In 1977 it was designated to salvage.

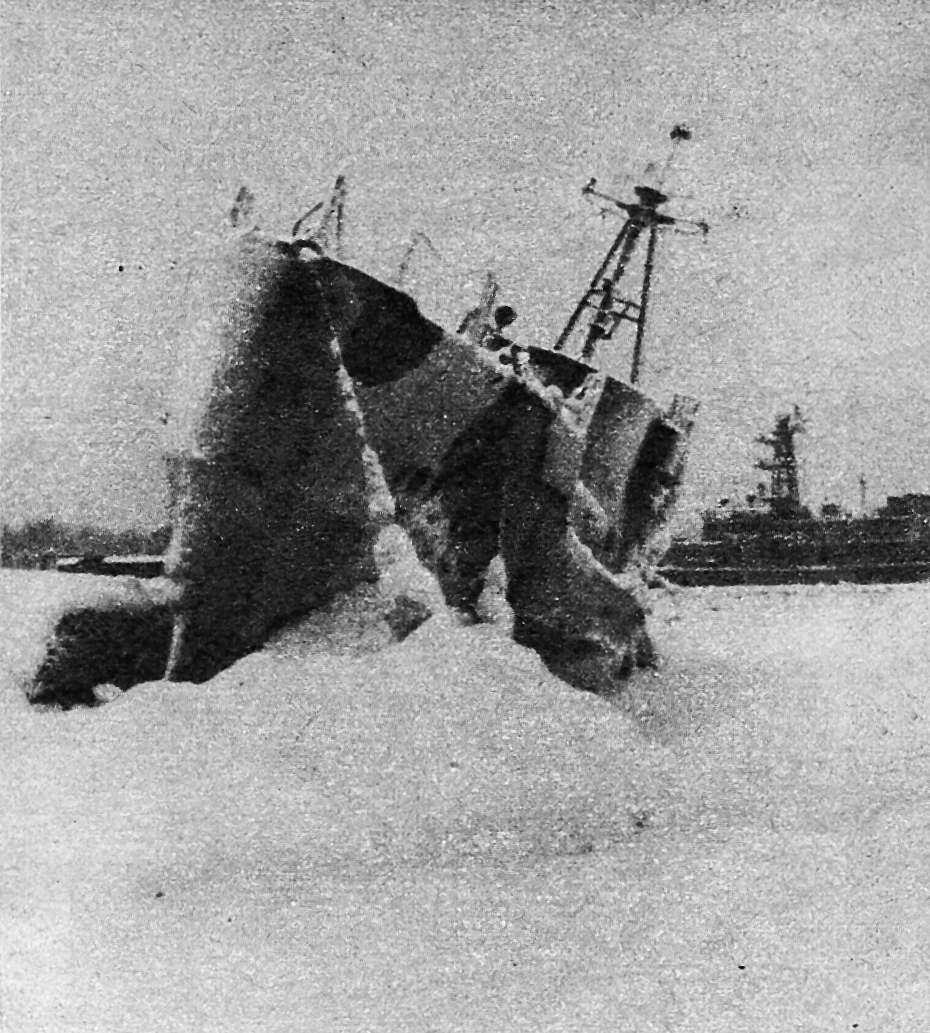
OH Kompas

A storm on New Year's Eve 1978/1979 broke the rigging and the ship was beached at the orchestra at basin X, and removed from active service.

On or about 16 July 1981, she was towed by the tugboat H-12 to the Hel peninsula and the salvage operation began.

== Service ==
- 1937 – laying the stump for the main haul
- 22 September 1938 – waterborne
- 31 September 1939(?) raising of the Polish Flag
- 14 September – lowering of the Polish Flag
- 2 October 1939 – 1945 – captured by Germany during World War II; in service as a German warship Oxhöft in Kriegsmarine
- since 15 October 1945 – at Deutsche Mineräumdienststeilung
- 25 January 1946 – raising of the Polish flag and return to Polish original name ORP Żuraw.
- 15 October 1948 – retro as a hydro-graphical and drafting studio service ship.
- 1 September 1951 – detour of the craft to Sweden
- 1951 – renaming to ORP Kompas
- December - Military service quarters barge BK–4
- 1977 – end of life service cycle with salvage destination.
- 31 December 1978/1 January 1979 – breaking of anchors and consequent shoring.
- 1981 beginning of salvage operation.

== Technical data ==
- Displacements:
  - Standard – 183 tons,
  - full– 203 tons (after retro. – 300 tons)
- dimensions:
  - overall length – 45 m (after retro. 45.7 m)
  - width – 5.5 m (after retro. 5.5 m)
  - submergence – 1.7 m (after retro. 2.2 m)
- power plants: 2 8 cyl. Diesel engines with a combined total power of 1050 HP
- reach: 4300 Mm speed 8.3 w. – after retro.
- cruising speed: 18 knots (after retro. 14.3 w)
- crew: 30 (after retro. 38)
- Armament (prior to 1939):
  - 1 cannon caliber 75 mm
  - 1 dual interlocked machine gun 13.2 mm Hotchkiss
  - 2 heavy antiaircraft machine guns caliber 7.92 mm
  - 20 contact mines type 08/39
  - 20 depth bombs
- Armament (1946–1948):
  - 5 antiaircraft machine gun caliber 20 mm (one dual and one single)
  - 20 nautical mine wz.08
- Armament (1948–1949):
  - 2 antiaircraft machine guns caliber 20 mm (1 dual interlocked)
- after 1950 – disarmed
- trolling equipment: 2 sets (as a minesweeper)

== Bibliography ==
- St. Kierzkowski, Okręt hydrograficzny ORP "Żuraw" w: Żołnierz Polski 16-17/1990
- St. Kierzkowski, Okręt hydrograficzny "Kompas" w: Żołnierz Polski 26/1988
- Marek Soroka, Polskie okręty wojenne 1945-1980, Wydawnictwo Morskie, Gdańsk 1986, ISBN 83-215-3249-7
