= Jaskółka-class minesweeper =

Minesweeper of the Polish Navy

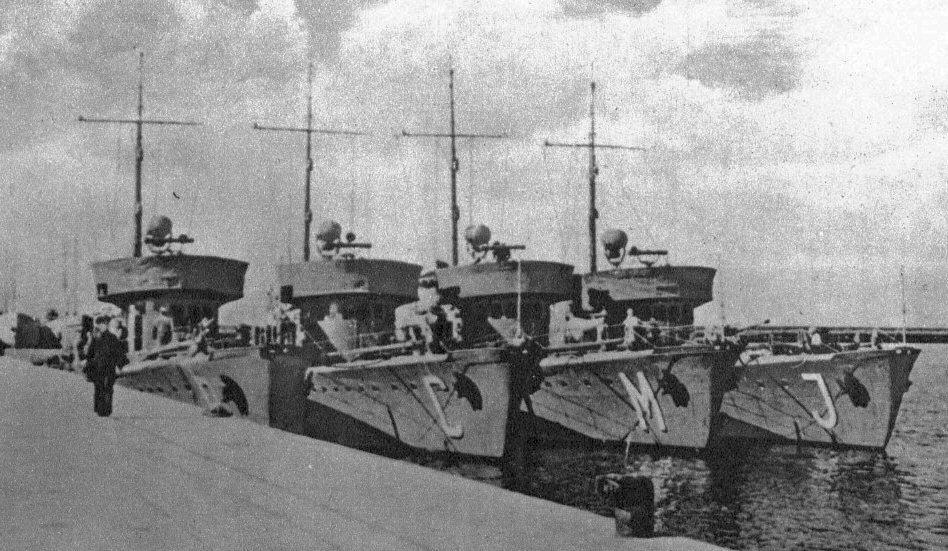
- Rybitwa, Czajka, Mewa, Jaskółka

Class overview
- Operators: Polish Navy
- Built: 1933–1939
- Building: 6
- Completed: 6
- Lost: 2

General characteristics
- Type: Minesweeper
- Displacement: 183 tons
- Length: 45.0 m
- Beam: 5.5 m
- Propulsion: 2 shaft diesel engines, 1040 BHP
- Speed: 17.5 knots
- Complement: 30
- Armament: 1 × 75mm; 2 × machine guns; 20 mines or 20 depth charges

The Jaskółka class was a class of six minesweepers of the Polish Navy built during the 1930s. They were the first sea-going warships of Polish production. The Jaskółka class was a versatile design which allowed the ships to serve in the role of either a minesweeper, small minelayer or a sub chaser. All were named after birds, therefore the class was nicknamed: ptaszki (English: birdies).

== Design and building ==
The first minesweepers in the Polish Navy were the German minesweepers of the FM type. These ships, built during the later part of World War I and bought by Poland during the early 20s, were already worn out by the 1930s so the Polish Navy required a replacement. The Modlin shipyard offered a design for the new class of minesweepers which was accepted. The first four ships of the class were built at Gdynia and Modlin. After they entered service they proved to be a good design so a further two were ordered in the mid 30s.

== Ships ==
Name	Laid down	Launched	Completed	Fate
Jaskółka	1934	11 September 1934	August 1935	Sunk, 14 September 1939
Czajka	April 1934	10 April 1935	February 1936	Captured by Germany, October 1939, and used as torpedo recovery vessel TFA11. Returned to Poland December 1945. Reclassified as a patrol boat in 1951, and again as an accommodation ship in 1966.
Mewa	1934	10 January 1935	October 1935	Sunk, 3 September 1939, raised by Germany and renamed Putzig; later used as torpedo recovery vessel TFA9. Returned to Poland in December 1945. Reclassified as a patrol boat in 1951, and again as an accommodation ship in 1970.
Rybitwa	May 1934	26 April 1935	December 1935	Sunk, 3 September 1939, raised by Germany and renamed Rixhoft; later used as torpedo recovery vessel TFA8. Returned December 1945. Reclassified as a patrol boat in 1951, and again as an accommodation ship in 1966.
Czapla	1937	22 August 1938	August 1939	Sunk, 14 September 1939
Żuraw	1937	22 August 1938	August 1939	Captured by Germany October 1939 and used as survey ship Oxhoft. Returned to Poland in December 1945. Reclassified as a survey vessel in August 1948.
