= Stefan de Walden =

Polish military commander

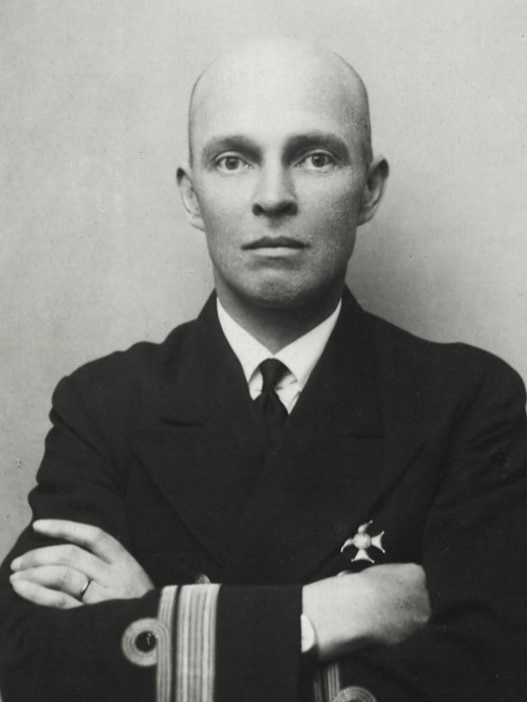
- Born: 27 December 1896
- Died: 17 January 1976 (aged 79); Gdynia, Poland
- Military career
- Allegiance: Russia; Poland
- Branch: Imperial Russian Navy; Polish Navy
- Rank: Komandor (Captain)
- Conflicts: World War I Polish–Soviet War; World War II
- Awards: Order of Virtuti Militari; Gold Cross of Merit

Stefan de Walden was a Polish military commander and engineer. He participated in the fights of the Riverine Flotilla of the Polish Navy during the Polish-Bolshevik War. During the Invasion of Poland of 1939, he served as the commanding officer of Wicher, a destroyer of the Polish Navy which took part in the Battle of the Gdańsk Bay. After the war, since 1947, he headed the Historical Detachment of the Naval Staff of Poland.

== Biography ==
In 1917, Stefan de Walden graduated from the Naval Cadet Corps in St. Petersburg and began his service in the Imperial Russian Navy, with the rank of michman. He was part of the crew of the cruiser Askold, which was gripped by revolutionary sentiments, and was temporarily elected commander of the ship. In March 1919, he reached Poland and was accepted into the emerging Navy, with the rank of naval lieutenant. Initially, he served in the naval battalion in Modlin, then in the Pinsk Flotilla. During Poland's Wedding to the Sea, he was among the officers accompanying General Haller.

During the Polish-Soviet War, he was the commander of the armored motorboat MP-1, operating on the Pripyat and the Dnieper. He took part in the battle of Chernobyl with ships of the Bolshevik Dnieper Flotilla on April 27, 1920, which ended with the sinking of one of the Bolshevik gunboats. During the retreat he commanded the ammunition tug "Leon", which was sunk by its own crew in Pripyat. He continued to fight in the Vistula Flotilla during the war. In 1922 he served temporarily in the Navy Command. In 1925 he returned to the sea, as the watch officer of the gunboat "Komendant Piłsudski", with the rank of naval captain. Later he was the navigation officer on the "Wilia". In the years 1928-1930 he was again in the Navy Command. Between 1930 and 1933 as the second commander of the training sailing ship "Iskra" he participated in cruises to Cuba and the United States (the first transatlantic cruise of a Polish warship), to the Mediterranean Sea and to Casablanca and the Azores. On 1 January 1932 he was promoted to the rank of lieutenant commander. In 1935, he took up the position of deputy commissioner for maritime affairs at the General Commissariat of the Republic of Poland in Gdańsk, and then the position of chief of staff of the Coastal Defense Command. On April 1, 1938, he was appointed commander of the destroyer "Wicher". On March 19, 1939, he was promoted to the rank of lieutenant commander.

On board "Wicher", he took part in the first days of fighting in the defense of the Polish coast. On September 3, 1939, he fought an artillery duel with two German destroyers. That same afternoon, "Wicher" was sunk by Luftwaffe bombs. Until the capitulation of Hel, he participated in its defense as head of communications. On the night of October 1–2, commanding a group of officers, he attempted to break through the German blockade of the peninsula on board the cutter "Hel-117". Taken prisoner, he was held in Oflag XVIII A Lienz[in other languages] and II C Woldenberg until 30 January 1945. After liberation, he returned to service in the PMW, and in 1945 he became head of the Navy Department at the General Staff in Warsaw. In 1947, he led the naval mission in London, conducting talks on the return to Poland of the Polish ships remaining there. On 27 June of that year, he signed the protocol for the acceptance of the destroyer "Błyskawica" and sailed on board it to Poland. Also in 1947, he was promoted to the rank of commander and returned to service in the General Staff. In 1948, he published an article in "Przegląd Morski" entitled "The Last Days of "Wichra" 30 VIII–3 IX 1939. After returning to the Coast, he became head of the Historical Department at the Main Staff of the Navy. He joined the reserve in the rank of commander, after which he began working at the Maritime Office in Gdynia, as head of department. He was also a juror of the Maritime Chamber. He died in 1976 and was buried in Gdańsk.

== Awards and decorations ==
- Silver Cross of Virtuti Militari (1921)
- Golden Cross of Merit (10 November 1938)
- Cross of Valour
- Commemorative Medal for the War of 1918–1921
- Medal of the Tenth Anniversary of Regained Independence
- Knight of the Order of Ouissam Alaouite (Morocco, 1933)
- Knight 1st Class of the Order of the Sword (Sweden, 1933)
- Officer of the Order of the Three Stars (Latvia, 1934)

== Bibliography ==
- de Walden Stefan. [w:] Kolekcja Orderu Wojennego Virtuti Militari; sygn. I.482.34-2551 [on-line]. Wojskowe Biuro Historyczne. [dostęp 2023-12-19].
- Kadry morskie Rzeczypospolitej. Tom II: Polska Marynarka Wojenna. Cz. 1: Korpus Oficerów 1918–1947, J.K. Sawicki (red.), J. Czerwiński, M. Czerwińska, Gdynia: Wyższa Szkoła Morska, 1996, ISBN 83-86703-50-4, OCLC 749437567.
- Barbara Szczepuła: Ile życie jest warte, gdy honor stracony. "Polska", 3 września 2010.

de Walden S., de Walden-Gałuszo K., Szarski W.: ORP Wicher i jego dowódca, Zeszyt Helski T. 18, Hel 2013.
