= ORP Jaskółka =

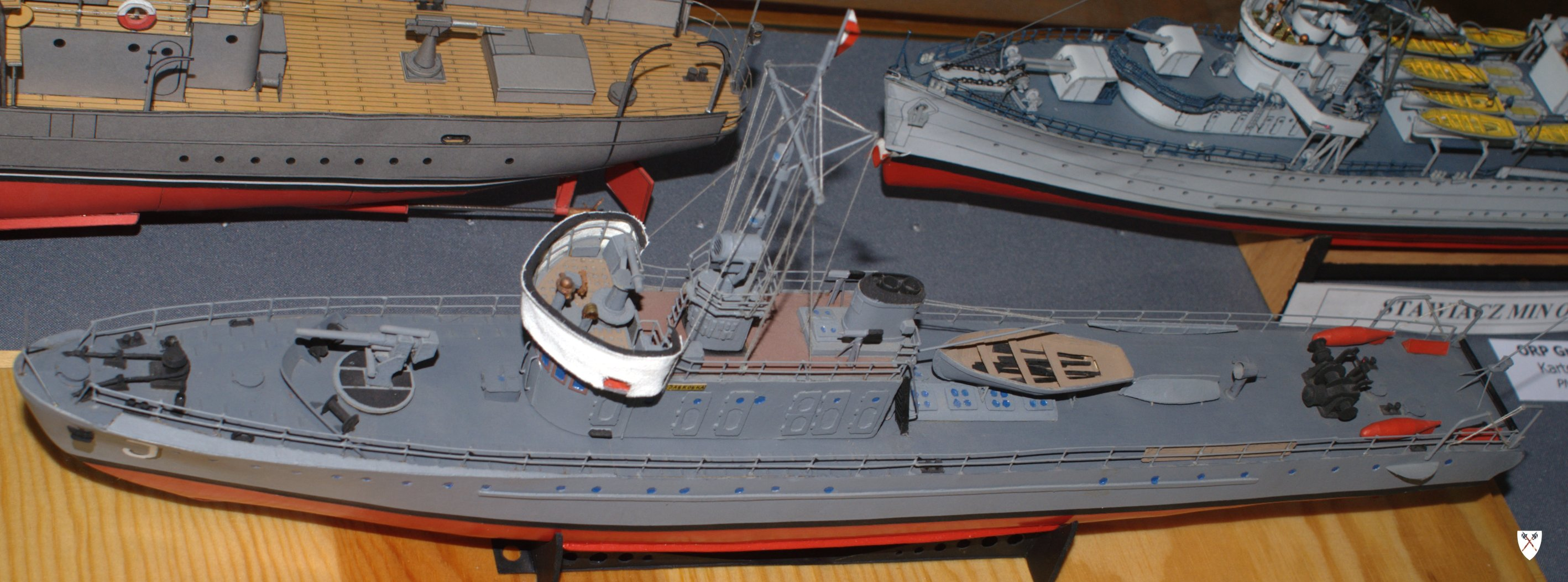

History

Poland
- Name: ORP Jaskółka
- Namesake: jaskółka, Polish word for "swallow"
- Launched: 11 September 1934
- Commissioned: 27 August 1935
- Fate: Sunk, 15 September 1939

General characteristics
- Class & type: Jaskółka-class minesweeper
- Displacement: 183 tons
- Length: 48 m (157 ft 6 in)
- Beam: 5.5 m (18 ft 1 in)
- Draft: 2.4 m (7 ft 10 in)
- Speed: 16–18 knots (18–21 mph; 30–33 km/h)
- Complement: 30
- Armament: 1 × 3 in (76 mm); 2 × anti-aircraft guns; 20 × mines

ORP Jaskółka was the lead ship of her class of minesweepers in the Polish Navy at the outset of World War II. Jaskółka was sunk during the Nazi invasion of 1939.

== History ==
Jaskółka was built at Gdynia; launched 11 September 1934; and commissioned 27 August 1935.

On 1 September 1939, Jaskółka under the command of captain Tadeusz Borysiewicz, along with other minesweepers, engaged in combat with German aircraft on their way to execute a bombing raid of the Hel Peninsula, in what became known as the Battle of the Gdańsk Bay. During the battle, sister ship Mewa was damaged. On the night of 12 September, Jaskółka and Czajka fired upon German positions. During the next two days, the same ships installed mines around the Hel peninsula to keep German ships from bombarding the defenders. On 14 September, Jaskółka was sunk after it was hit by a German bomb in the port of Jastarnia.
