= ORP Gryf (1936) =

Polish minelayer

Coordinates: 54°40′N 18°34′E

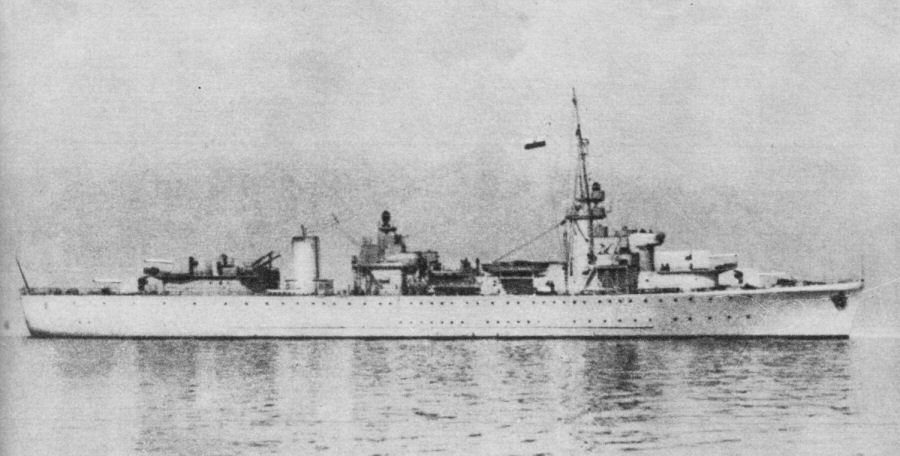
- ORP Gryf

History

Poland
- Name: ORP Gryf
- Namesake: griffin
- Ordered: 11 May 1934
- Builder: Chantiers et Ateliers A. Normand; Le Havre
- Laid down: 14 November 1934
- Launched: 29 November 1936
- Commissioned: 27 February 1938
- Fate: Sunk, bombed 3 September 1939, scrapped after war in late 1950s

General characteristics
- Type: Minelayer
- Displacement: 2,250 long tons
- Length: 103.00 m (337 ft 11 in)
- Beam: 13.06 m (42 ft 10 in)
- Draft: 3.60 m (11 ft 10 in)
- Installed power: 6,000 hp (4,500 kW)
- Propulsion: two Sulzer 8SD48 engines
- Speed: 20 knots (37 km/h; 23 mph)
- Range: 9,500 nmi (17,600 km; 10,900 mi) @ 14 knots (26 km/h/16 mph)
- Complement: 162 + 60
- Armament: 6 × 120 mm (4.7 in) Bofors wz. 34/36 guns (2 × 2 and 2 × 1) in four turrets; 4 × 40 mm (1.6 in) Bofors wz. 36 AA guns (2 × 2); 4 × 13.2 mm (0.52 in) Hotchkiss wz. 30 HMG's (2 × 2); 8 × naval mine racks, up to 600 mines

ORP Gryf (English: "Griffin") was a large Polish Navy minelayer, sunk during the 1939 German invasion of Poland. She was one of two large Polish ships that were not evacuated to Great Britain during Operation Peking prior to the outbreak of the Polish Defensive War (Wicher was the other). She was sunk in Hel harbour on 3 September 1939 during the opening stage of World War II.

== History ==
Built from 1934 at French shipyard Chantiers et Ateliers A. Normand in Le Havre, she was launched in 1936. Built to Polish specifications, she was a large minelayer with armament similar to that of a destroyer. She was intended to conduct independent operations and to fulfill most roles taken-on by destroyers. Powered by two Sulzer 8SD48 engines of 6,000 horsepower (4,500 kW) each, she was capable of 20 knots (37 km/h/23 mph), fast for its size. It also had quite a long range of roughly 9,500 nautical miles (17,600 km) at 14 knots (26 km/h). As the Polish Navy was small and no other state expressed a need for such a vessel, she remained the only ship of that class. Prior to the outbreak of World War II she also served as a school ship and could take on board up to 60 additional students and NCOs.

== Combat ==
On 1 September 1939, with six minesweepers, Gryf left the naval base at Gdynia for the Operation Rurka, a failed attempt to lay a minefield at the entrances to the Gdańsk Bay. After taking aboard naval mines from a floating depot, the flotilla headed for Hel Peninsula, assisted by ORP Wicher and two gunboats. En route she was attacked by a squadron of 33 German Ju 87B dive bombers and damaged with several close misses. Although the damages were minor, the ship lost 22 sailors, including her captain Lt Cmdr Stefan Kwiatkowski in what became known as the Battle of the Gdańsk Bay. His deputy, Capt. Wiktor Łomidze decided to throw all defused naval mines in the waters for fear of explosion and headed for Hel naval base. There it was decided to use the ship as a floating anti-air artillery battery guarding the harbour.

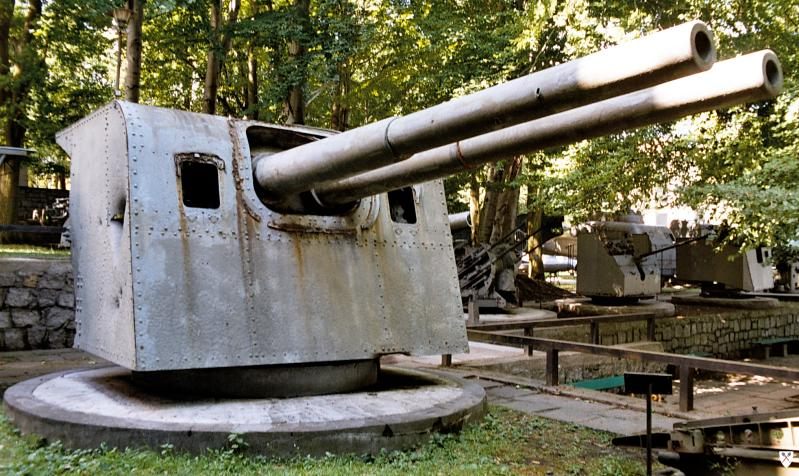
Artillery turret of ORP Gryf preserved in the Museum of the Polish Navy in Gdynia

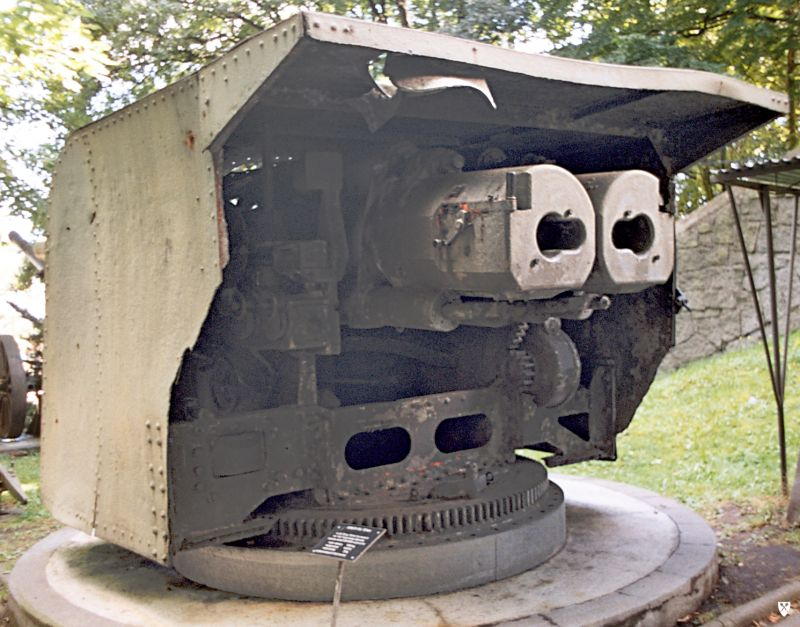
Rear view of the only preserved artillery turret of Gryf

In the morning of 3 September 1939, ORP Gryf and ORP Wicher, moored in the harbour, were attacked by two German destroyers, Z1 Leberecht Maass (with Rear Admiral Günther Lütjens) and Z9 Wolfgang Zenker. Polish warships and a shore battery repulsed the attack, with Gryf scoring at least one hit on Leberecht Maas (4 killed). Gryf herself was slightly damaged with one shot. Later the same day, after three attacks of German bombers, Gryf was heavily damaged, and partially sank in the harbour. By 5 September the fire was extinguished and two stern 120 mm artillery mountings (single and twin one) were dismounted and placed ashore as a shore battery No. 34, part of the defensive system of the Hel Peninsula. They reached readiness only on 30 September, just before capitulation.

In November 1939, after the end of the invasion hostilities, the Germans raised the wreck and hauled it to a beach near Jastarnia, where it was used as an artillery practice target. After World War II the wreck was used as a target by the Polish Air Force. In 1957 it was decided that the wreck be raised. By 1960 the work was completed and most of the salvaged parts were scrapped.
