= ORP Czajka (1935) =

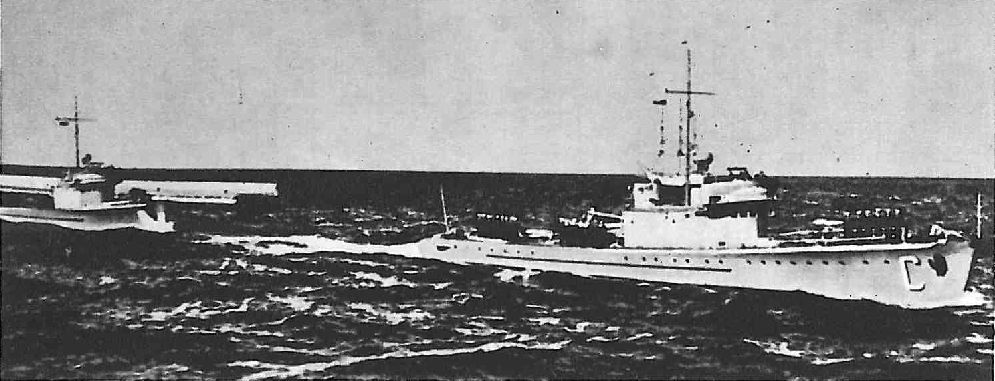

History

Poland
- Name: ORP Czajka
- Builder: Państwowa Stocznia Modlińska, Modlin

General characteristics
- Class & type: Jaskółka class minesweeper
- Displacement: 183 t standard
- Length: 45,0 meters
- Beam: 5,5 meters
- Propulsion: 2 x Diesel engines, 1050 HP total
- Speed: 17,5 knots
- Armament: 1 x 75mm, 2 x 7,92mm machine guns; 20 mines or 20 depth charges

ORP Czajka was a Jaskółka class minesweeper of the Polish Navy at the outset of World War II. It was built by the riverine shipyard at Modlin. Czajka sunk by the Germans during the defense of Poland during the Nazi German invasion of 1939. She was subsequently refloated and taken into service by the Kriegsmarine.

== Bibliography ==
- Twardowski, Marek & Lemachko, Boris (1980). "Germany". In Chesneau, Roger (ed.). Conway's All the World's Fighting Ships 1922–1946. London: Conway Maritime Press. ISBN 0-85177-146-7.
