= ORP Mewa (1935) =

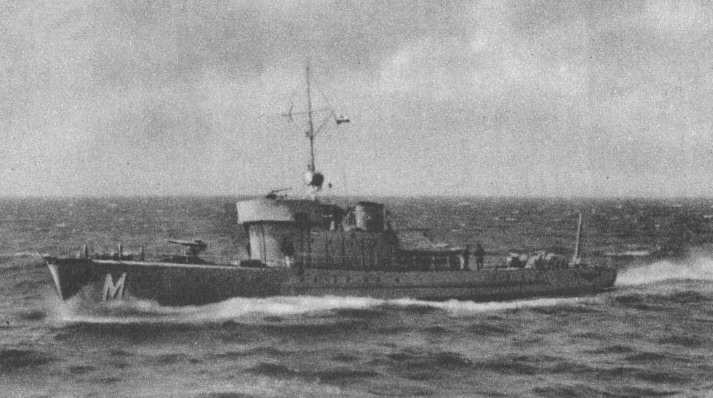
- ORP Mewa, in 1937

History

Poland
- Name: ORP Mewa ("seagull")
- Builder: Stocznia Gdyńska, Gdynia
- Launched: 10 January 1935
- Fate: Sunk 3 September 1939, later raised

General characteristics
- Class & type: Jaskółka-class minesweeper
- Displacement: 183 t standard
- Length: 45 m (147 ft 8 in)
- Beam: 5.5 m (18 ft 1 in)
- Propulsion: 2 x diesel engines, 1,050 hp (780 kW) total
- Speed: 17.5 knots (32.4 km/h; 20.1 mph)
- Armament: 1 x 75 mm gun; 2 x 7.92mm machine guns; 20 mines or 20 depth charges

ORP Mewa (Polish for "seagull") was a Jaskółka-class minesweeper of the Polish Navy at the outset of World War II. Mewa participated in the defense of Poland during the German invasion of 1939. The ship was damaged on 1 September 1939 by a German bomb. On 3 September she was again hit by bombs and sank. The ship was later refloated and captured by the Germans. After the war, she returned to serve under the Polish flag.

== Bibliography ==
- Twardowski, Marek & Lemachko, Boris (1980). "Germany". In Chesneau, Roger (ed.). Conway's All the World's Fighting Ships 1922–1946. London: Conway Maritime Press. ISBN 0-85177-146-7.
