= Hel Peninsula =

Sand bar peninsula in northern Poland

Hel
- Peninsula
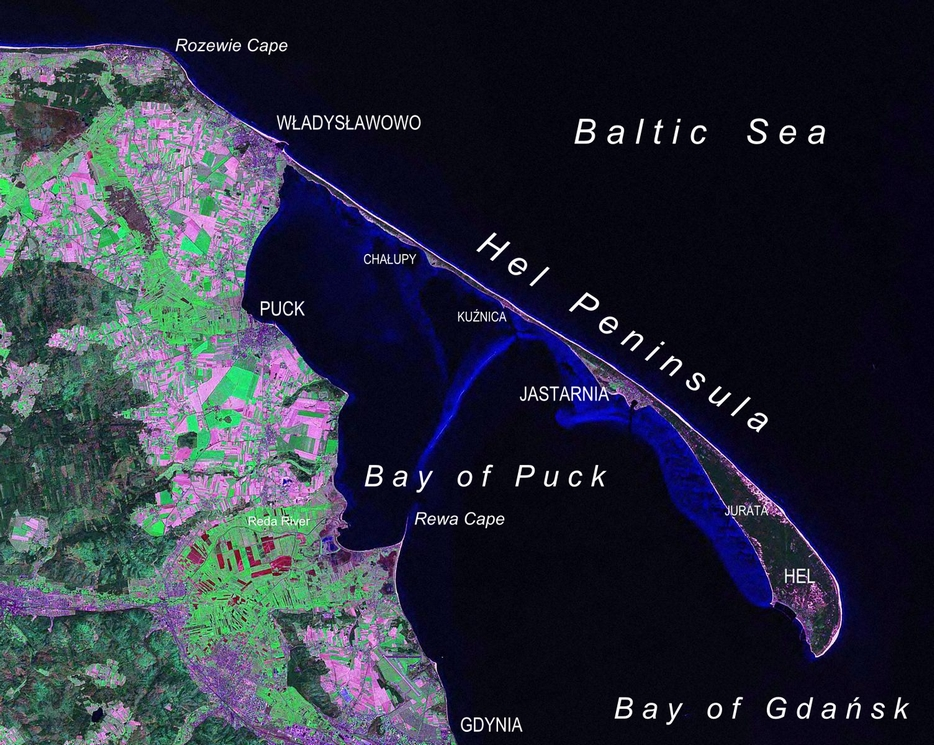
- Hel Peninsula as seen from Landsat satellite in 2000

- Location within Poland
- Coordinates: 54°38′30″N 18°46′53″E
- Country: Poland
- Voivodeship: Pomeranian
- County: Puck

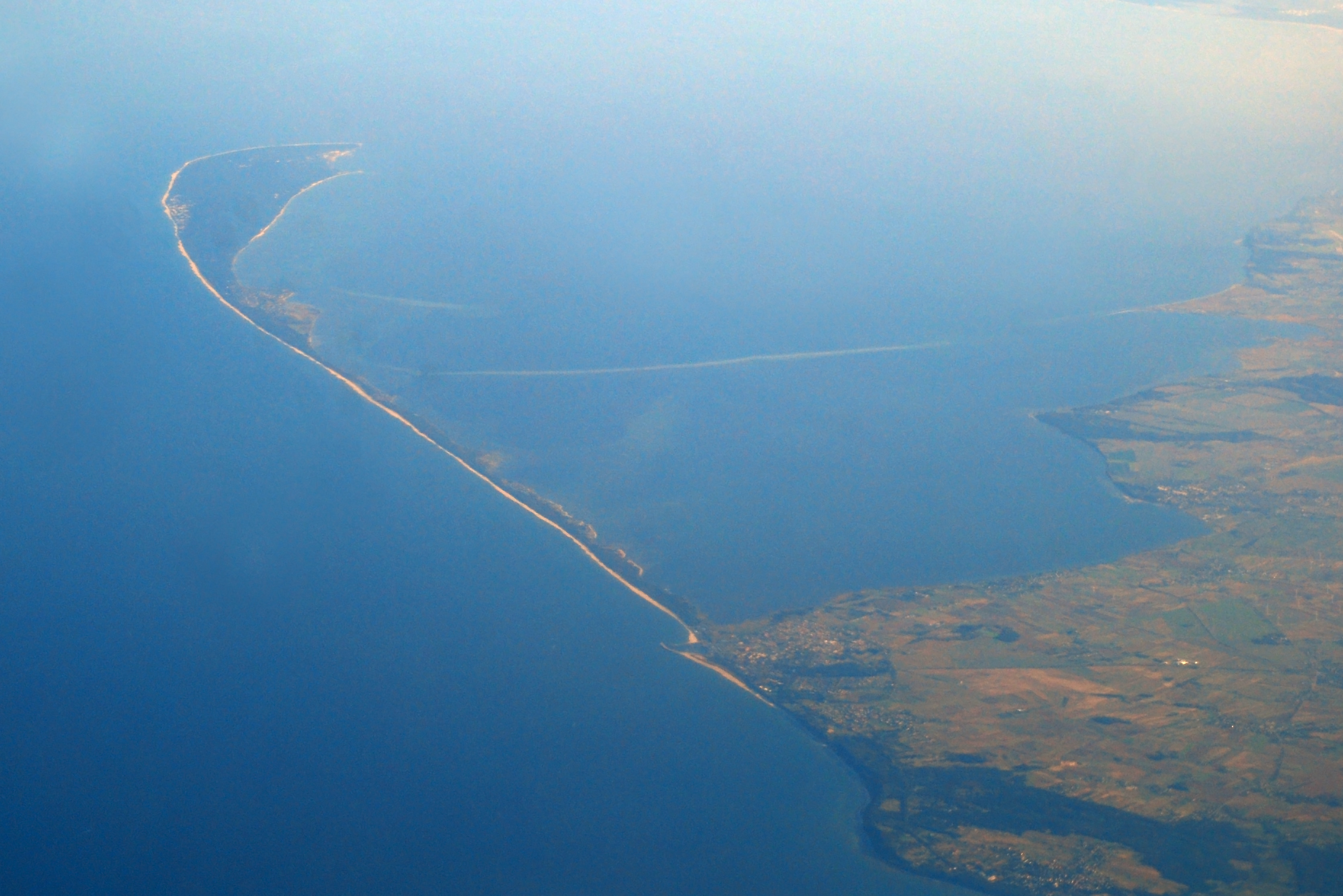
Hel Peninsula

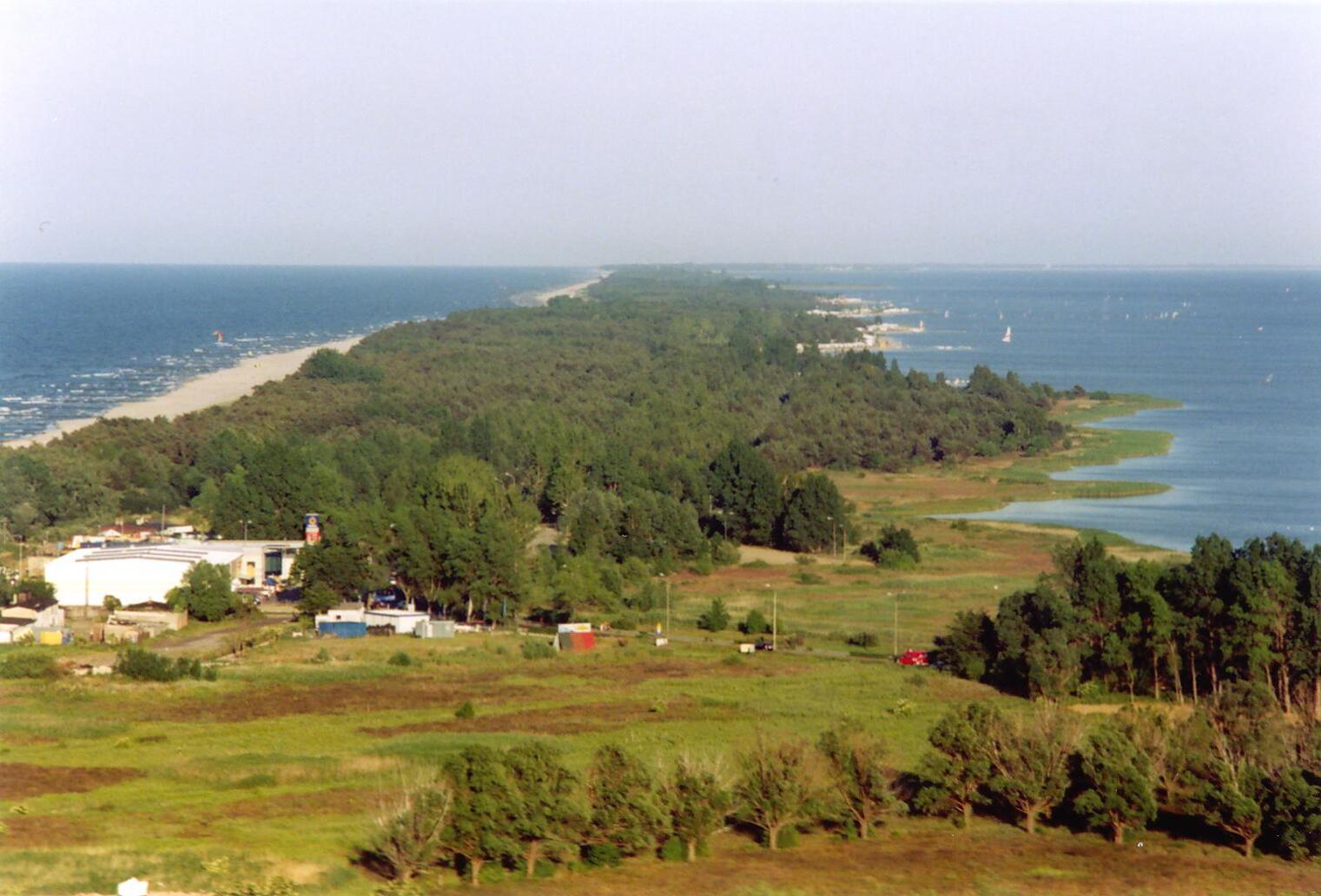
Hel Peninsula as seen from Władysławowo

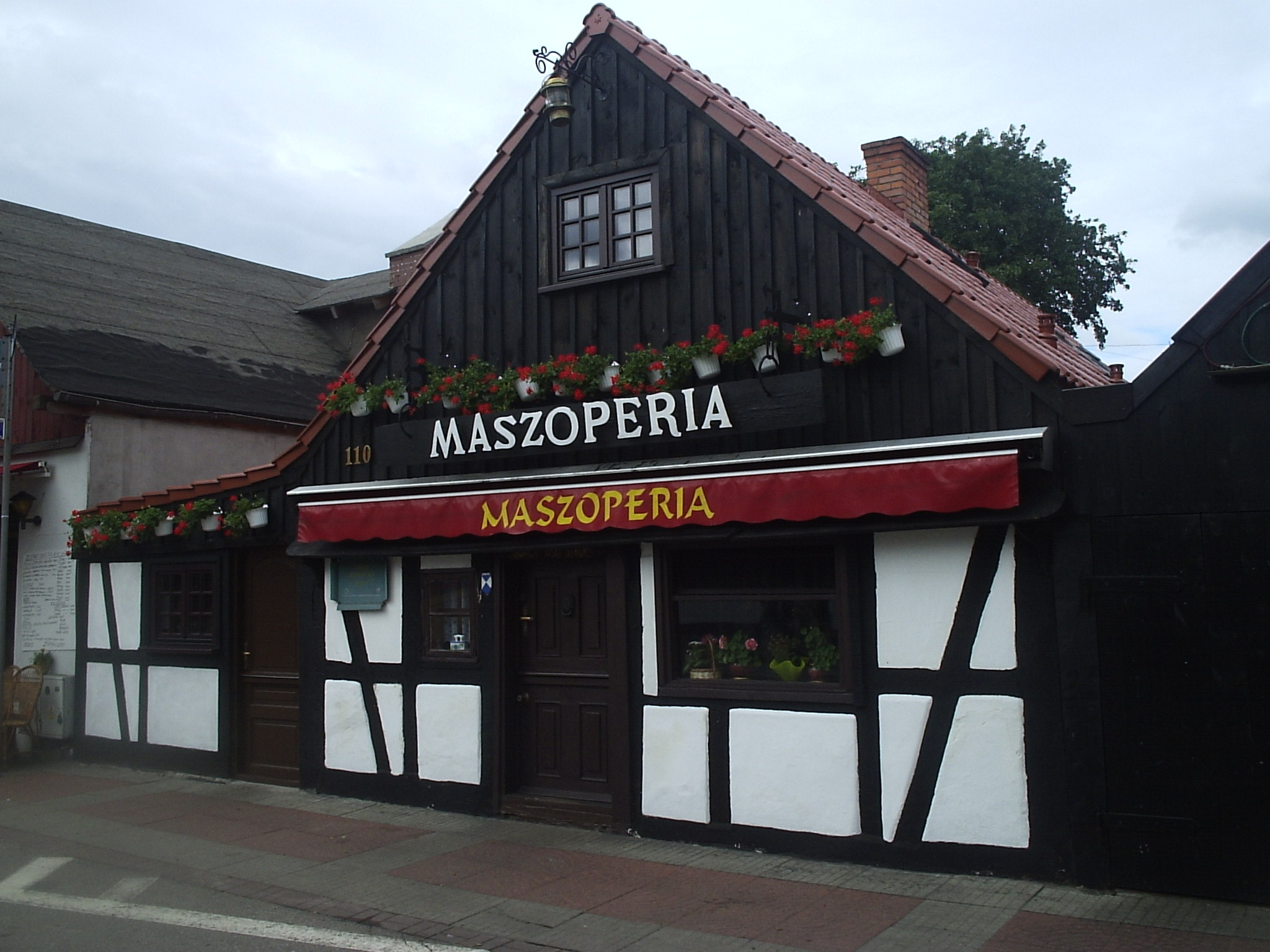
Wooden house from circa 1850, now a restaurant

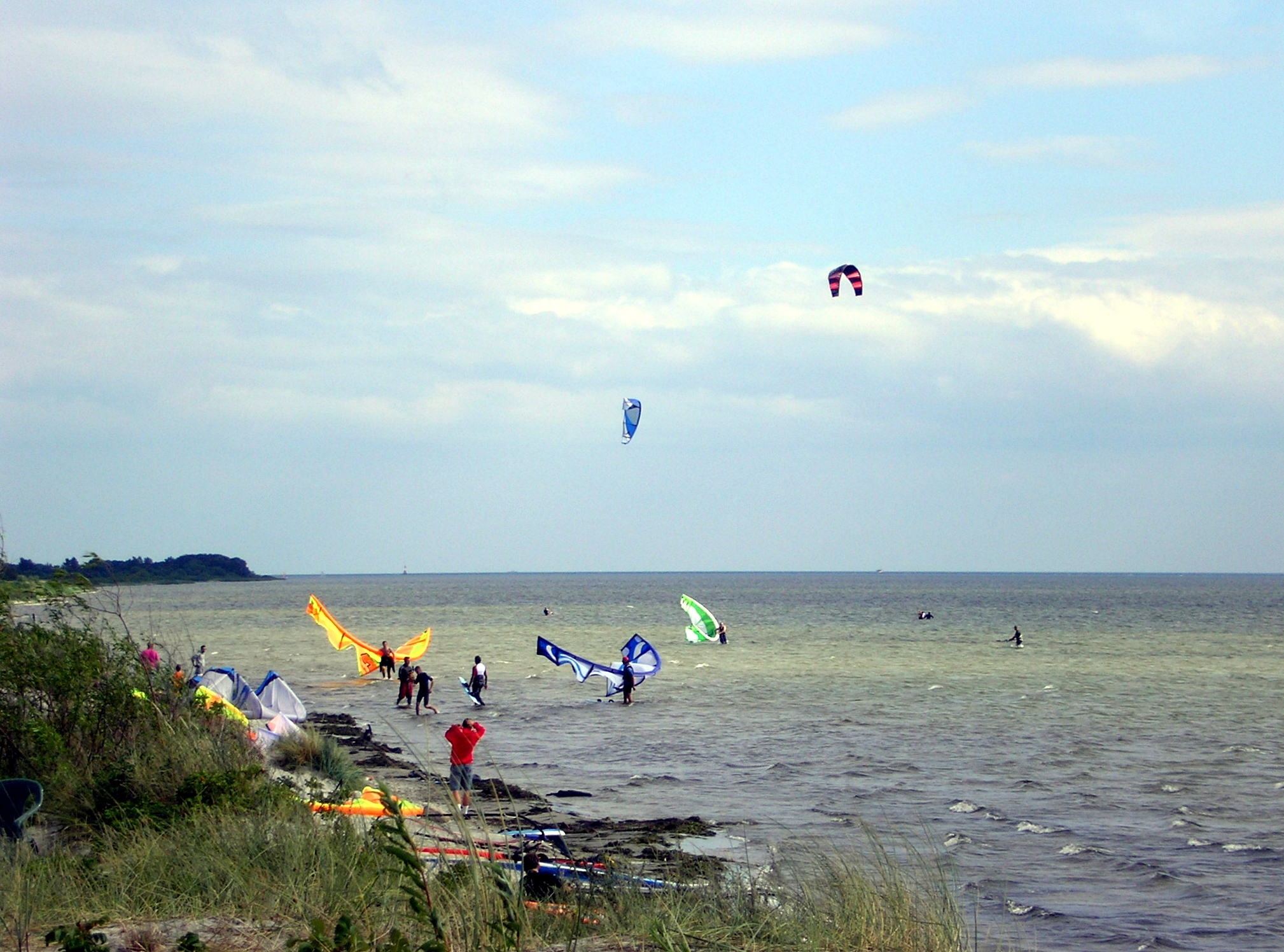
Kitesurfing, Hel Peninsula

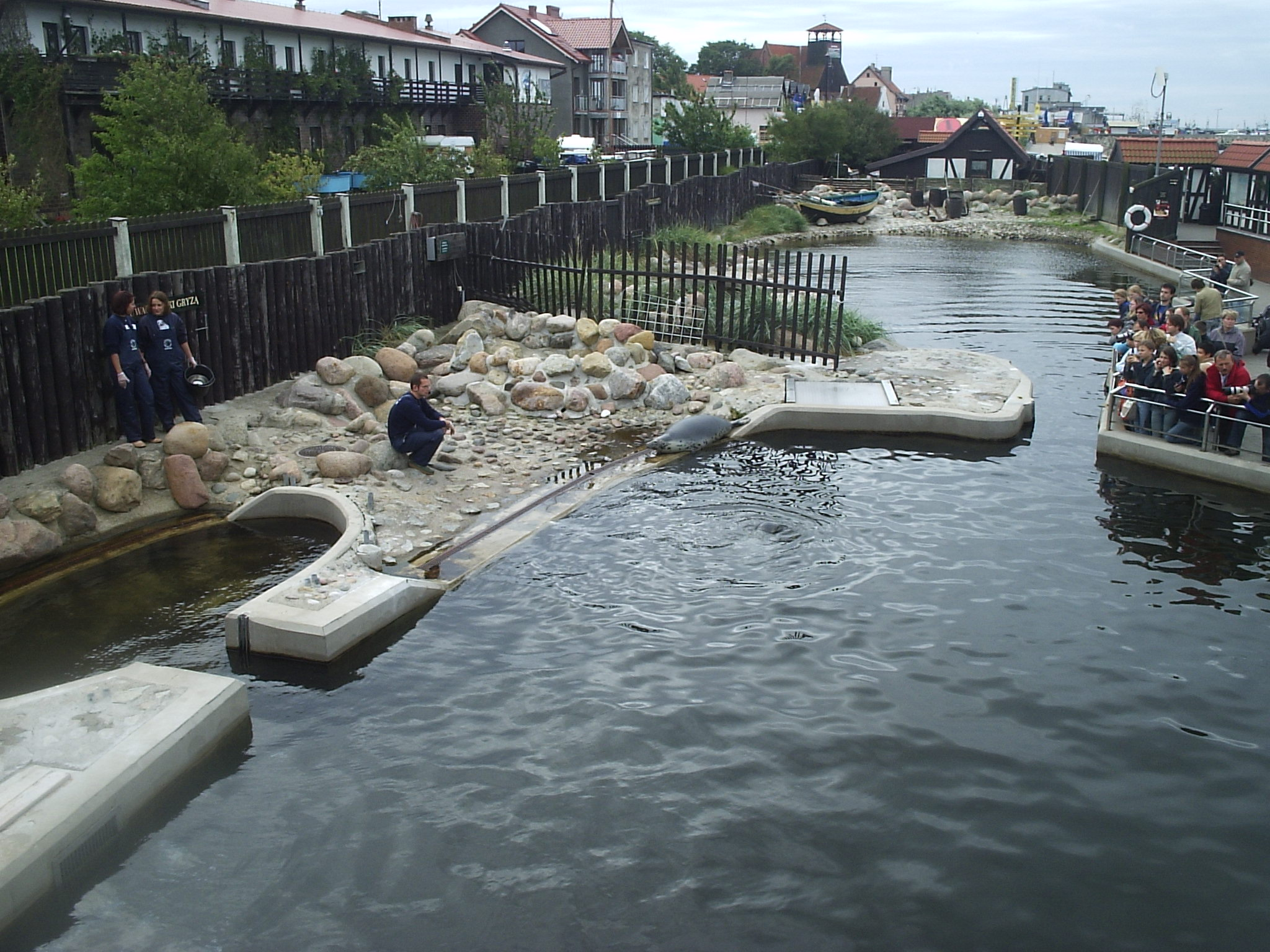
Seal at the Oceanography Institute

Hel Peninsula or Hel Spit (Polish pronunciation: [xɛl]; Polish: Półwysep Helski, Mierzeja Helska; Kashubian: Hélskô Sztremlëzna) is a 35-kilometre-long (22 mi) sand bar peninsula in northern Poland separating the Bay of Puck from the open Baltic Sea. It is located in Puck County of the Pomeranian Voivodeship.

== Name ==
The name of the peninsula possibly comes from the Old Polish word hyl/hel, meaning "empty or exposed place".

== Geography ==
The width of the peninsula varies from approximately 300 metres (980 ft) near Jurata to 100 metres (330 ft) in the most narrow part to over 3 kilometres (1.9 mi) at the tip. Since the peninsula is formed entirely of sand, it is frequently turned into an island by winter storms. Until the 17th century, the peninsula was a chain of islands that formed a strip of land only in the summer.

A road and a railroad run along the peninsula from the mainland to the town at the furthest point, Hel, a popular tourist destination. Other towns, ports, and tourist resorts are Jurata, Jastarnia, Kuźnica, Chałupy, and Władysławowo.

Bus transport on the peninsula consists of only one route, the 669. The route was originally numbered 666, which played on the biblical number of the beast and the similarity of the name "Hel" to the English word "hell". This raised complaints from Catholic groups which found the numbering blasphemous. The number was changed in 2023.

== Military importance ==
The Hel Peninsula was part of Polish-Lithuanian Commonwealth before it was annexed by Prussia in 1772. From 1772 to 1919, it was known by its German name Hela. After the peninsula became part of the Second Polish Republic after World War I, it acquired considerable military significance as part of the Polish Corridor and was turned into a fortified region, with a garrison of about 3,000. In the course of the Battle of Hel in 1939, Polish forces dynamited the peninsula at one point and turned it into an island.

During the years of German occupation of Poland (1939–1945), Hel's defenses were further expanded, and a battery of three 40.6 cm SK C/34 gun was constructed, but the guns were soon moved to the Atlantic Wall in occupied France. Hel peninsula remained in German hands until the end of World War II, when the defending forces surrendered on 14 May 1945, six days after Germany capitulated.

After the war, when the peninsula again became part of Poland, it continued to have military significance, with much of its area reserved for military use. Additional gun batteries were built in the 1940s and the 1950s. Many of the fortifications and batteries are open to tourists today, but some areas of the peninsula still belong to the Polish Armed Forces.

== Gallery ==
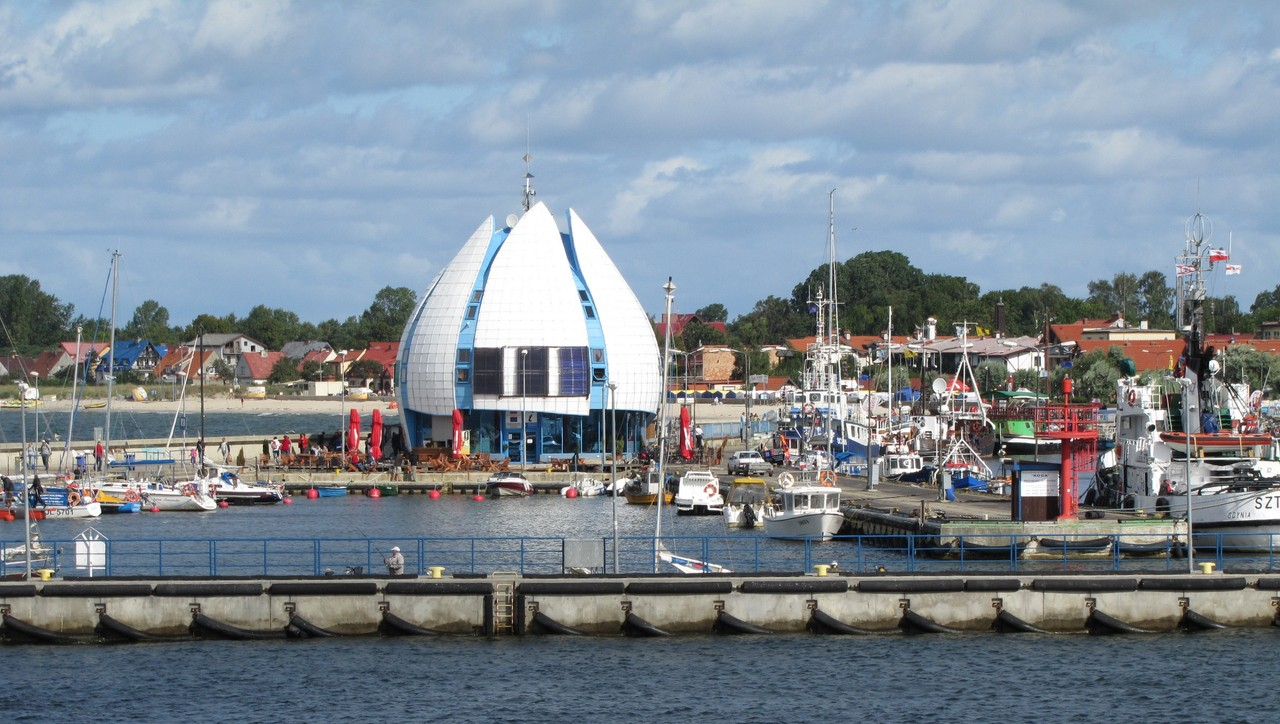
Hel

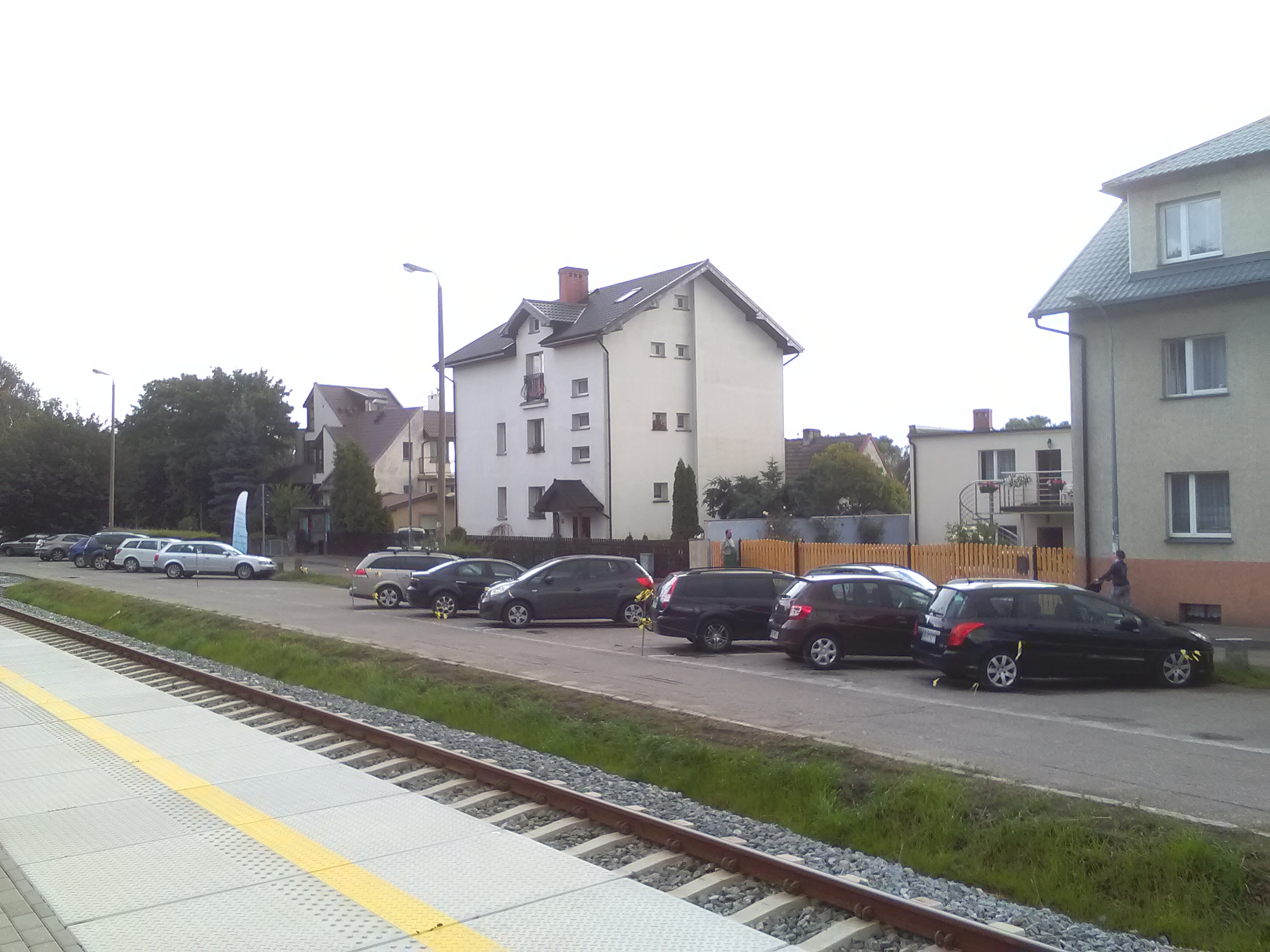
Jastarnia

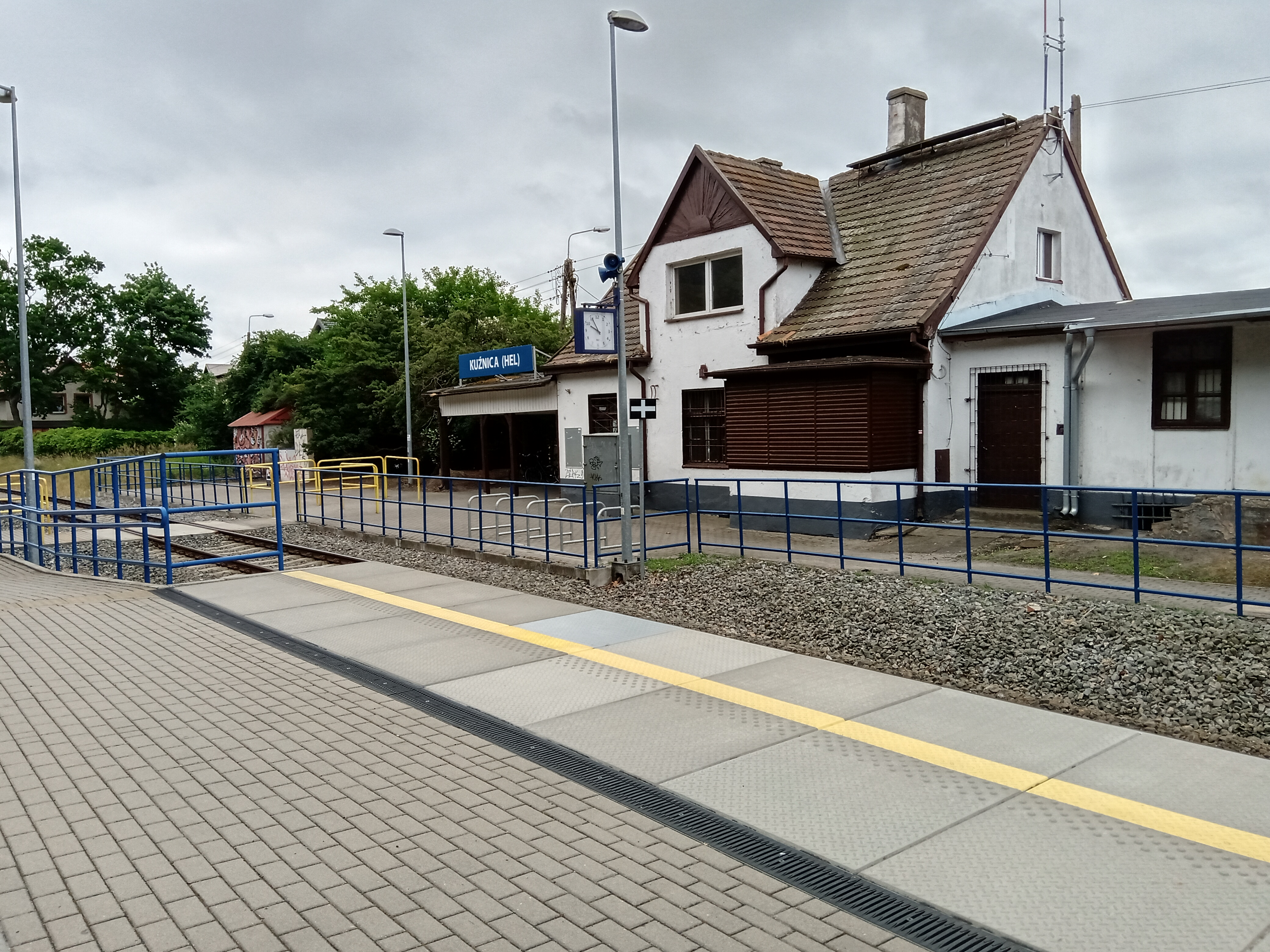
Kuźnica

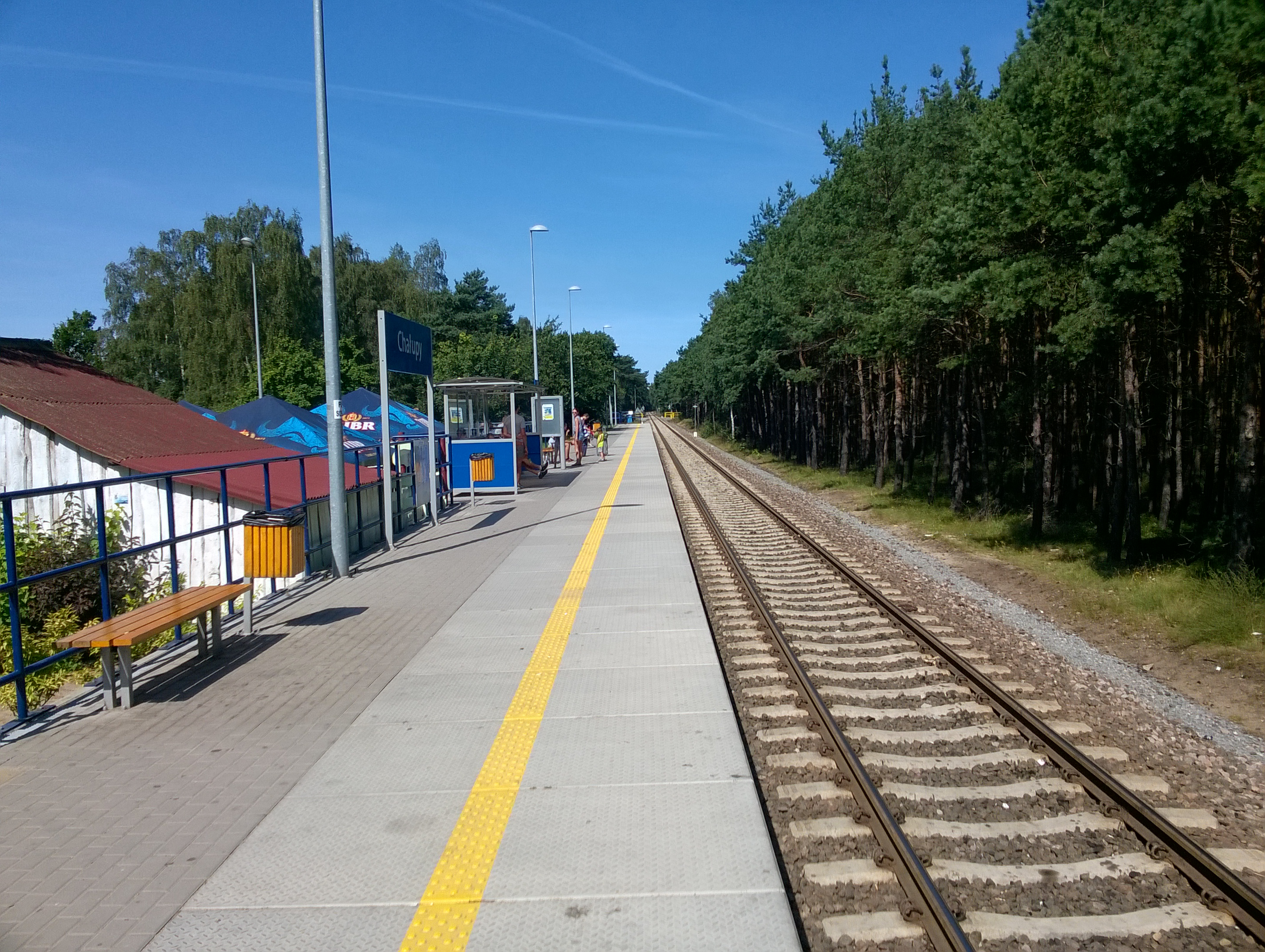
Chałupy

== See also ==
- Hel Fortified Area
- Heliodor Laskowski's Artillery Battery No. 31
- Hel Lighthouse
- List of peninsulas
- Westerplatte
- Vistula Spit
