= Józef Unrug =

Polish Admiral who contributed to the reestablishment of Poland's navy

Admiral Józef Unrug
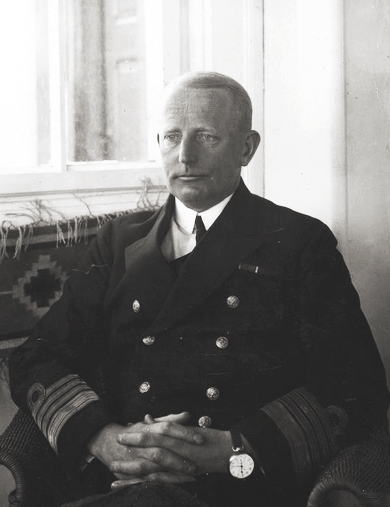
- Born: 7 October 1884; Brandenburg an der Havel, Germany
- Died: 28 February 1973 (aged 88); Lailly-en-Val, France
- Military career
- Allegiance: German Empire (Poland) Second Polish Republic
- Branch: Imperial German Navy; Polish Navy
- Service years: German Empire: 1907-1918; Poland: 1919-1948
- Rank: Rear Admiral (Wiceadmirał)
- Commands: SM UB-25, SM UC-11 and SM UC-28; C-i-C of the Polish Navy
- Conflicts: World War I, Polish-Soviet War, Invasion of Poland (1939)
- Awards: Gold Cross of Merits with Swords; Gold Cross of the Virtuti Militari; Polonia Restituta, Commanders' Cross; Iron Cross, First and Second Classes (German Empire)

Józef Unrug (German: Joseph von Unruh; 7 October 1884 – 28 February 1973) was a German-born Polish admiral who served as a submarine commander in the Imperial German Navy in World War I and helped create Poland's navy after the independence of Poland. During the opening stages of World War II, he served as the Polish Navy's commander-in-chief. As a German POW, he refused all German offers to change sides and was incarcerated in several Oflags, including Colditz Castle. He stayed in exile after the war in the United Kingdom, Morocco and France where he died and was buried. In September 2018 he was posthumously promoted in the rank of vice admiral by the President of Poland. After 45 years his remains, along with those of his wife Zofia, were exhumed from Montrésor and taken in October 2018 to his final resting place in Gdynia, Poland.

== Naval officer ==
Józef Michał Hubert Unrug was born in Brandenburg an der Havel into a noble family of Prussian and Polish descent. He was the son of Thaddäus Gustav von Unruh, a Generalmajor in the Prussian Army. His aristocratic family was extremely wealthy and he grew up as very much a member of the elite.

After graduating from the gymnasium in Dresden, Unrug completed naval college in 1907 and began his service in the Imperial German Navy. The major intellectual influence on the Imperial German Navy from the 1890s onward was the 1890 book The Influence of Sea Power upon History by the American historian Alfred Thayer Mahan. German emperor Wilhelm II had read it and enthusiastically embraced the book's message that whichever nation had the most powerful "blue water navy" would dominate all of the world's oceans and would always be the world's greatest power. Starting in 1898, the German Navy was transformed from a "green water navy" meant to operate in the North Sea and the Baltic Sea into a "blue water navy" meant to dominate all of the world's seas. Mahan's theories about sea power and world power remained the dominant intellectual basis of all German naval thinking right up to 1945, and The Influence of Sea Power Upon History became the "Bible" of the German navy. In common with all other German naval officers, Unrug had to read Mahan's book as part of his officer's education.

Unrug was a romantic who was disenchanted with modern Germany and came to see in the Poles the sort of romanticism and passion that he found missing in Germany. Unrug grew up speaking German, but he was of partially Polish descent on his father's side.

During World War I, he commanded a U-boat, and was promoted to command the training-submarine half-flotilla. In 1914, he was a lieutenant commander in the Imperial German Navy in command of a submarine, but he was distrusted by the senior command and was assigned to training duties in the Baltic instead of a combat command. The Polish historian Władysław Szarski described Unrug as an aloof man who few knew well, but was very "serious" about his duties and was "extremely just and principled".

== Career ==
In 1919, after Poland regained independence, Unrug left Germany and volunteered for the Polish Armed Forces. Soon afterwards, he was transferred to the nascent Polish Navy, where he served as chief of the Hydrographic Division and then as commanding officer of a submarine flotilla. Out of his pocket, the wealthy Unrug purchased the hydrographic ship which became ORP Pomorzanin for the new navy. To establish the maritime frontiers of the newly reestablished Polish state required a ship to perform shipped surveys and to make maps. Unrug's purchase of the ship, which was needed urgently at the time, won him many allies in the Marynarka (Polish Navy).

One of the most skilled officers in the Polish Navy, Unrug was quickly promoted to Counter Admiral. In 1924, he came into conflict with Admiral Kazimierz Porębski and was put on a paid leave for a year. In 1925, Porębski had to resign in a scandal after he was discovered taking bribes. Overcoming his limitations in the Polish language, he became Commander of the Fleet of the Polish Navy in 1925. Unrug's task as commander of the Marynarka was largely to train officers for the nascent force. Unrug was respected, but not loved as he imposed a very strict discipline. The Marynarka in the interwar period tended to favor the Mahanian concept of a fleet strong enough to dominate the Baltic, which would allow ships from Poland's ally France to enter the Baltic and deliver supplies to Poland. However, the vast cost of buying warships caused successive governments in Warsaw to balk at the immense expenditure that this would entail and to reject the "green water navy" plans of the Marynarka. This was all the more so as the Franco-Polish alliance of 1921 committed France to automatically go to war if Poland were attacked. This would mean that Poland in a sense could "borrow" the services of the French Navy, which was expected to enter the Baltic to ensure that French supplies would reach Poland. In the late 1920s, the Sanation regime had decided to buy a force of 9 mine-laying submarines with the intention of protecting Poland's coastline. However, as Poland lacked sufficient funds to buy submarines, a loan from France was necessary, and the French made extending the loan conditional upon the Poles also buying two destroyers. In this way, the Marynarka acquired two destroyers despite the doubts of Marshal Józef Piłsudski, Poland's de facto leader, about the need for the two destroyers. The Marynarka ended up with the two French-built destroyers, ORP Wicher and the ORP Burza together with the French-built submarines Wilk, Żbik, and Ryś.

Unrug and Admiral Jerzy Świrski were often at odds with Marshal Piłsudski, who was opposed to what he called their "grandiose" plans for a vast Polish fleet. Unrug and Świrski wanted Poland to have at least a "green-water navy" that would dominate the Baltic and ultimately aimed for a "blue-water navy" capable of reaching out into the North Sea and the Atlantic. Despite Piłsudski's opposition to greater naval expenditure, after much lobbying by Unrug, the Marynarka acquired two French-built destroyers and three submarines between 1930 and 1932. Piłsudski himself favored a "brown-water navy" for Poland as he wanted the Marynarka to be equipped only with riverine gunboats and coastal patrol boats. A turn to navalism in Poland started in August 1930, when the German cabinet minister Gottfried Treviranus delivered a belligerent speech in Berlin advocating that Germany take all back all of the lands lost to Poland under the Treaty of Versailles by any means necessary, including war. In response, various civic groups in Poland started a public subscription campaign to raise enough money to buy a submarine to be named The Answer to Treviranus. By 1935, enough money had been raised to buy a submarine from a Dutch shipyard, which entered the Marynarka under the name Orzeł. The fund-raising effort to buy the submarine put navalism into the mainstream of Polish politics in the 1930s.

The Polish historian Jacek Lubecki noted that the "prodigious" increase in naval spending took place despite Piłsudski's doubts, which he attributed to the decay of the Sanation regime as Piłsudski's mental facilities declined. Piłsudski had created a very "personalistic" dictatorship with power concentrated into his hands, and with his mental decline the regime was plunged into "chaos", leading to a very haphazard and confusing decision-making process. This allowed Admiral Unrug to press successfully for greater naval spending over Piłsudski's doubts. Lubecki argued the money spent on the Marynarka was "squandered", as he contended that money spent on buying expensive destroyers and submarines would have been better spent on building up a motorized tank and anti-tank forces for the Army instead. A force of considerable assistance to the Marynarka was the Maritime and Colonial League, a society made up of people influenced by Mahan, who believed that building a "blue-water navy" would make Poland into a world power and allow it to acquire a colonial empire in Asia and Africa. Apart from advocating navalism, the Maritime and Colonial League was also supportive of the Sanation regime at a time when the Great Depression had damaged its popularity.

In 1932, Unrug and Commander Tadeusz Morgenstern-Podjazd were summoned to a meeting with Piłsudski and were ordered to send the destroyer ORP Wicher under command of Morgenstern-Podjazd into the Free City of Danzig (modern Gdańsk, Poland). The cruise of the Wicher resulted in the Danzig crisis of 1932, the successful resolution of did much to raise the prestige of the Marynarka in Poland. In the aftermath of the Danzig crisis with the successful use of gunboat diplomacy, Piłsudski approved a six-year expansion plan for the navy, ordering two Grom-class destroyers and two Orzeł-class submarines. The principal problem with Polish defense spending was the far greater size of the German economy—for example, the total Polish defense spending in the five years 1934-1939 for the Army, Navy and Air Force combined amounted to just one-tenth of the Luftwaffe's budget for the year 1939. As such, no matter how much money was devoted to the Marynarka, the Kriegsmarine would always be the greater force, making the plans for a "green-water navy" capable of dominating the Baltic impractical. Despite the economical problems, in 1936 it was announced in Polish newspapers that the Marynarka was committed to a "maximum plan" of buying two battleships that would cost 70,000,000 zlotys each, plus two heavy cruisers. By 1938, Polish newspapers were reporting that the "maximum plan" now envisioned a fleet of 3 battleships, 1 aircraft carrier, 2 heavy cruisers, 12 destroyers, 24 torpedo boats, 24 submarines, 16 minesweepers and 1 mine-layer. The "maximum plan", which went well beyond Poland's economic capacity at the time, was a "fantasy", and in practice the Marynarka had to settle in 1938 for a construction plan of two destroyers, two submarines, four minesweepers and seven motor torpedo boats. Reflecting the economic problems caused by the Great Depression, the Sanation regime planned to raise part of the necessary funds to pay for the scaled down "maximum plan" via public subscription.

At the beginning of the Danzig crisis in May 1939, Unrug shifted the two naval rifle battalions assigned to defend Gdynia to building field works in the Polish Corridor. In the summer of 1939, Unrug was appointed commander of the Coastal Region Defense and relocated from Gdynia to the strategic Hel Peninsula. General Sir Adrian Carton de Wiart, the chief of the British military mission to Poland, believed that the disparity in size between the Kriegsmarine and the Marynarka made it advisable for the latter to have as much of its fleet out of the Baltic before a possible war started and to be based in British ports. This was the origin of "Operation Peking". Marshal Edward Rydz-Śmigły was initially opposed to Carton de Wiart's suggestion but ultimately decided to accept it. Rydz-Śmigły believed if the Danzig crisis led to a war, it would be possible for France and Britain to supply arms to Poland via Romania and as such control of the Baltic was not necessary. Rydz-Śmigły ordered Unrug to make the necessary preparations to move the Polish fleet out of the Baltic. On 26 August 1939, the day after the signing of the Anglo-Polish alliance, Unrug issued the captains of all of the Polish destroyers, except the Wicher which had engine problems, with sealed envelopes with orders not to open them until the message "Execute Peking" was received. On 29 August 1939, Unrug issued the order "execute Peking", which led the captains to open the envelopes containing the message to sail for Britain within three hours of opening the envelopes.

=== World War II ===
During the 1939 invasion of Poland, Unrug executed his plan of strategically withdrawing the Polish Navy's major vessels to the United Kingdom ("Operation Peking"). At the same time, he got all Polish submersibles to lay naval mines in the Bay of Gdańsk ("Plan Worek"). Following that operation, these vessels either escaped to the United Kingdom or sought refuge in neutral countries. Another plan Unrug had developed was Operation Rurka for the mine-layer Gryf to lay a minefield off the Hel peninsula, but he decided to wait until the war started. On 1 September 1939, Germany invaded Poland and Unrug gave the orders for Rurka. The Gryf was not ready until 12 hours after receiving the order and by the time she put to sea, she was spotted by German aircraft and was sunk. Unrug has been widely criticized for waiting until Germany invaded to launch Operation Rurka, but Szarski has defended him, saying that laying mines in the waters that ships had to cross to enter and leave the Free City of Danzig could have been presented by Germany as a casus belli.

Despite having effectively given up control of Poland's naval vessels, Unrug remained in command of multiple military units, which he tasked with protecting the Polish Corridor from German attacks. Polish opposition to the advancing Germans was described as "fierce" and the Wehrmacht did not reach the headland connecting the Hel to the mainland until 9 September 1939. Unrug had about 2,000 men under his control in the Hel. The narrow Hel peninsula was a natural defensive barrier as there were limited avenues of attack for a force advancing onto the peninsula and in addition the peninsula had been partially fortified starting in 1936. The campaign started on 11 September 1939 when the Wehrmacht's 207th Infantry Division took the village of Władysławowo, cutting the Hel off from the mainland. The 207th Infantry Division began to march up the Hel while the Poles staged a slow fighting retreat. The forests and sand dunes of the Hel aided the defenders. At the narrowest part of the Hel between the villages of Chałupy and Kuźnica, only one company at a time could advance, which allowed the Poles during the course of fierce fighting to halt successive German attempts to advance up the peninsula despite the latter having two battleships, the Schleswig-Holstein and the Schliesen, together with a destroyer flotilla and the Luftwaffe, providing fire support. Conditions for the Polish defenders on the Hel were hellish as the Luftwaffe bombed them incessantly while the powerful guns of the Schleswig-Holstein and the Schliesen pounded them constantly.

On 20 September 1939, Adolf Hitler arrived at the Kasino hotel in Zoppot (modern Sopot) on the other side of the Bay of Danzig to watch the spectacular sight of the two battleships blasting away with their 11-inch guns to hammer the Polish defenders on the Hel. A popular story has that Unrug forbade his gunners who wanted to fire at the Kasino hotel because it would be dishonorable to kill a head of state. But there are no documents supporting this story and Szarski has pointed out that it is not clear if Unrug actually knew that Hitler was staying at the Kasino hotel. Furthermore, under international law the hotel was considered a civilian facility, which would make shooting at it a war crime. The Polish coastal artillery struck back, managing to damage the Schleswig-Holstein and the destroyer Leberecht Maas. The heavy bombardments provoked a brief mutiny among some of the soldiers on the Hel, who wanted to surrender, which was put down by Unrug. The mutineers were not professional soldiers or sailors, but rather local reservists who had been called up just before the war, and many of whom could see their homes across the bay. Unrug did not execute any of the mutineers, through under Polish military law he was obliged to. The morale of some of the other Polish defenders helped—as Unrug discovered on 30 Septemberz when he visited the Lasowski battery at the tip of the Hel, whose gunners demanded to fight on to the bitter end, prompting Unrug to break down in tears, saying he had never seen braver men. The news from the Lasowski battery commander and the other battery commanders was less encouraging as Unrug was informed that the batteries were almost out of artillery shells while the supply of food had been almost exhausted. On the same day, the Poles had exploded a cache of buried explosives, which nearly severed the Hel and turned the upper part of it into an island. The explosion had temporarily halted the German advance.

On 1 October 1939, however, after both Warsaw and Modlin had capitulated, Admiral Unrug decided that further defense of the isolated Hel Peninsula was pointless, and the following day all units under his command capitulated. Unrug later gave as his reasons for surrendering that his forces were almost out of artillery shells and that he felt the civilians living in the coastal fishing villages had suffered enough. The decision to surrender was painful for him, but he took a certain pride that his forces in the Hel peninsula were one of the last Polish units in Poland to surrender. After sending men out under a white flag to negotiate a ceasefire, Unrug ordered all sensitive documents be burned, allowed those who wished to try to escape across the Baltic the chance to do so, and declared that he would go into captivity with his men. At the Kasino Hotel, Unrug's representatives signed the instrument of surrender late on the night of 1 October 1939.

Unrug spent the rest of World War II in various German POW camps, including Fort Srebrna Góra, Oflag II-C in Woldenberg, Oflag XVIII-C in Spittal, Stalag X-B in Sandbostel, Oflag IV-C (Colditz Castle), and finally Oflag VII-A Murnau. In Oflag VII-A Murnau, Unrug was the highest-ranking officer and commander of the Polish soldiers interned there as prisoners of war. The Germans treated Unrug with great respect, on account of him having previously been a German officer, by bringing former Imperial German Navy friends to visit him with the intention of making him switch sides. Unrug responded by refusing to speak German, saying that he had forgotten that language in September 1939. To the irritation of the Germans, Unrug would always insist on having a translator present or communicating in French, when speaking with the Germans, even though he was a native German speaker. Unrug was greatly insulted by the attempt to have him switch sides, which made him identify with Poland even more. As a POW, Unrug had a relatively privileged life, being allowed his own bathroom and his batman, which were privileges not normally extended to POWs. Unrug was considered to be a leader of men who inspired other POWs to look up to him. This led his captors to fear that he was inspiring escape attempts by the other POWs, thus leading to his frequent moves between various POW facilities.

Unrug's spirit and unbowed attitude proved to be an inspiration to his fellow prisoners. At the Colditz castle, Unrug served as one of the co-leaders of the Polish POWs being held there together with General Tadeusz Piskor. General Piskor was the most senior Polish officer held at Colditz, but Unrug was older than him and spoke fluent German, so in practice the two men shared the leadership. The Polish historian Mieczysław B. Biskupski wrote that Admiral Unrug "...was perhaps not the greatest tactician of the interwar navy, but his conduct in German captivity was the stuff of legend".

=== Post-war exile ===
After Poland was taken over by the Soviet Union in 1945, Unrug went to the United Kingdom, where he served with the Polish Navy in the West and took part in its demobilisation. After the Allies withdrew support from the Polish government, Unrug remained in exile, in the United Kingdom, and then moved to France. In exile, Unrug worked in a marina in Morocco tending to the care of cutters and in France he worked as a chauffeur. He died there on 28 February 1973 in the Polish Veterans' care home in Lailly-en-Val near Beaugency, at the age of 88. On 5 March 1973, he was buried in Montrėsor cemetery. In 1976, a stone tablet commemorating Unrug was unveiled in Oksywie. Unrug had specified in his will that he should not be buried on Polish soil until such time as all the remains of his fellow naval officers and men had been recovered from enemy control.

== Exhumation and state funeral ==
On 24 September 2018 Vice admiral Joseph Unrug and his wife Zofia (died 1980) were exhumed and transferred with a guard of honour at the French port of Brest for reburial in the Polish port of Gdynia, Poland, after a delay of 45 years. A state funeral was held in Oksywie on 2 October 2018 in the presence of Andrzej Duda, the President of Poland among other members of the Polish government and leaders of the Polish Armed Forces. The chief mourner was Christophe Unrug, the admiral's grandson and, by happenstance, the current mayor of Montrésor in France.

In September 2018, Polish President Andrzej Duda had posthumously promoted Counter Admiral Joseph Unrug to Vice Admiral. The promotion citation was handed to Unrug's family during the funeral at the cemetery.

== Promotions ==
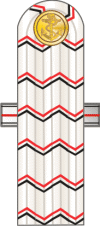
- Leutnant zur See (Ensign) - 1907
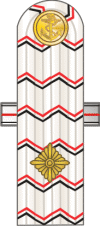
- Oberleutnant zur See (Lieutenant, junior grade) - 1909
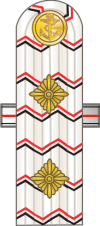
- Kapitänleutnant (Lieutenant) - 1915
- Kapitan marynarki (Lieutenant) - 1919
- Komandor podporucznik (Lieutenant commander) - 1921
- Komandor porucznik (Commander) - 1923
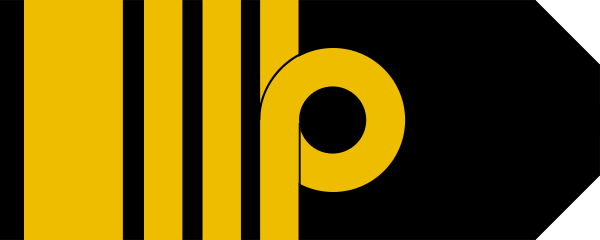
- Komandor (Captain) - 3 May 1926
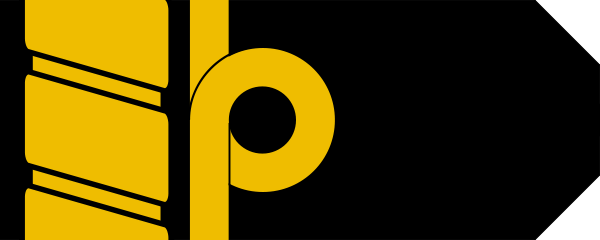
- Kontradmirał (Commodore) - 21 December 1932
- Wiceadmirał (Rear admiral) - 2 September 1946
- Admirał floty (Vice admiral) - posthumously, 21 September 2018

== Honours and awards ==
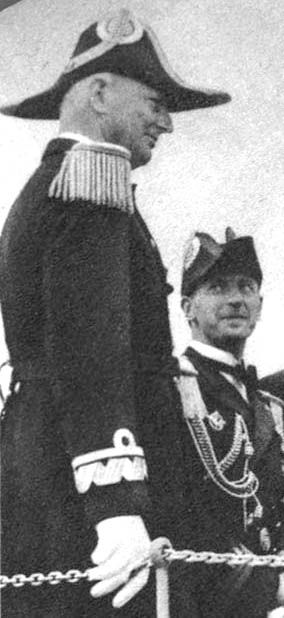
Józef Unrug (left)

Golden Cross of the Virtuti Militari
Commander's Cross of the Polonia Restituta
Officer's Cross of the Polonia Restituta
Gold Cross of Merits with Swords
Gold Cross of Merit
Commemorative Medal for the War of 1918–1921
Medal of the 10th Anniversary of Regained Independence
Honorary Badge of Airborne and Antigas Defence League
Officer of the Legion of Honour (France)
Iron Cross, 1st Class (German Empire)
Iron Cross, 2nd Class (German Empire)
Commander of the Order of Dannebrog (Denmark)
Order of the White Elephant (Siam)
Commander Grand Cross Royal Order of the Sword (Sweden)
Commander 1st Class Royal Order of the Sword (Sweden)
Commander Grand Cross Order of the Three Stars (Latvia)

== See also ==
- Polish Navy
- Polish Defensive War
- Jerzy Świrski

== Books and articles ==
- Biskupski, Mieczysław (Fall 2002). "Review of Poland's Navy, 1918-1945 by Michael Alfred Peszke". The Polish Review. 47 (4): 424–426.
- Epkenhans, Michael (2003). "Wilhelm II and 'his navy' 1888-1918". In Annika Mombauer; Wilhelm Deist (eds.). The Kaiser: New Research on Wilhelm II's Role in Imperial Germany. Cambridge: Cambridge University Press. pp. 12–36. ISBN 1139440608.
- Gusejnova, Dina (2016). European Elites and Ideas of Empire, 1917-1957. Cambridge: Cambridge University Press. ISBN 978-1107120624.
- Haarr, Geirr H. (2013). The Gathering Storm: The Naval War in Northern Europe September 1939 - April 1940. Barnsley: Seaforth Publishing. ISBN 978-1848321403.
- Jędrzejewicz, Wacław (1982). Piłsudski, a Life for Poland. New York: Hippocrene Books. ISBN 0882546333.
- Hargreaves, Richard (2010). Blitzkrieg Unleashed: The German Invasion of Poland 1939. Mechanicsburg: Stackpole Books. ISBN 978-0811707244.
- Lubecki, Jacek (Winter 2011). "Jozef Pilsudski's Influence on the Polish Armed Forces of the Interwar Period". The Polish Review. 52 (1/2): 23–45. doi:10.2307/41549947. JSTOR 41549947. S2CID 254434126.
- Moorhouse, Roger (2019). Poland 1939: The Outbreak of World War II. New York: Basic Books. ISBN 978-0465095384.
- Peszke, Michael Alfred (1999). Poland's Navy, 1918-1945. New York: Hippocrene Books I. ISBN 0781806720.
- Reid, Patrick (1984). Colditz: The Full Story. London: Macmillan Press. ISBN 0760346518.
- Stoker, Donald (2003). Britain, France and the Naval Arms Trade in the Baltic, 1919 -1939: Grand Strategy and Failure. London: Routledge. ISBN 1135774226.
