= People's Navy =

People's Navy may refer to:

== Books ==
- This People's Navy: The Making of American Sea Power, a 1992 book by Kenneth J. Hagan

== Organizations ==
- People's Liberation Army Navy, the navy of China
- Volksmarinedivision, an armed group during the German Revolution of 1918-19
- Volksmarine, the navy of East Germany
- Korean People's Navy, the navy of North Korea
- Vietnam People's Navy, the navy of Vietnam
