= ORP Myśliwy =

Polish patrol boat

History

Poland
- Name: ORP Myśliwy
- Builder: Electric Launch Incorporated (Elco)
- Laid down: 1917
- Commissioned: April 1, 1921
- Decommissioned: January 15, 1926
- Fate: scrapped

General characteristics
- Class & type: patrol boat
- Type: Motor Launch
- Displacement: 37 t (36 long tons)
- Length: 24.6 m (80 ft 9 in)
- Beam: 3.9 m (12 ft 10 in)
- Draft: 1.6 m (5 ft 3 in)
- Speed: maximum: 19 kn (35 km/h; 22 mph); economic: 15 kn (28 km/h; 17 mph)
- Range: 1,000 nautical miles at economic speed; 750 nautical miles at maximum speed
- Crew: 11
- Armament: 1 × MG 08 medium machine gun (until 1923); 1 × 47 mm Hotchkiss M1885 gun (after 1923)

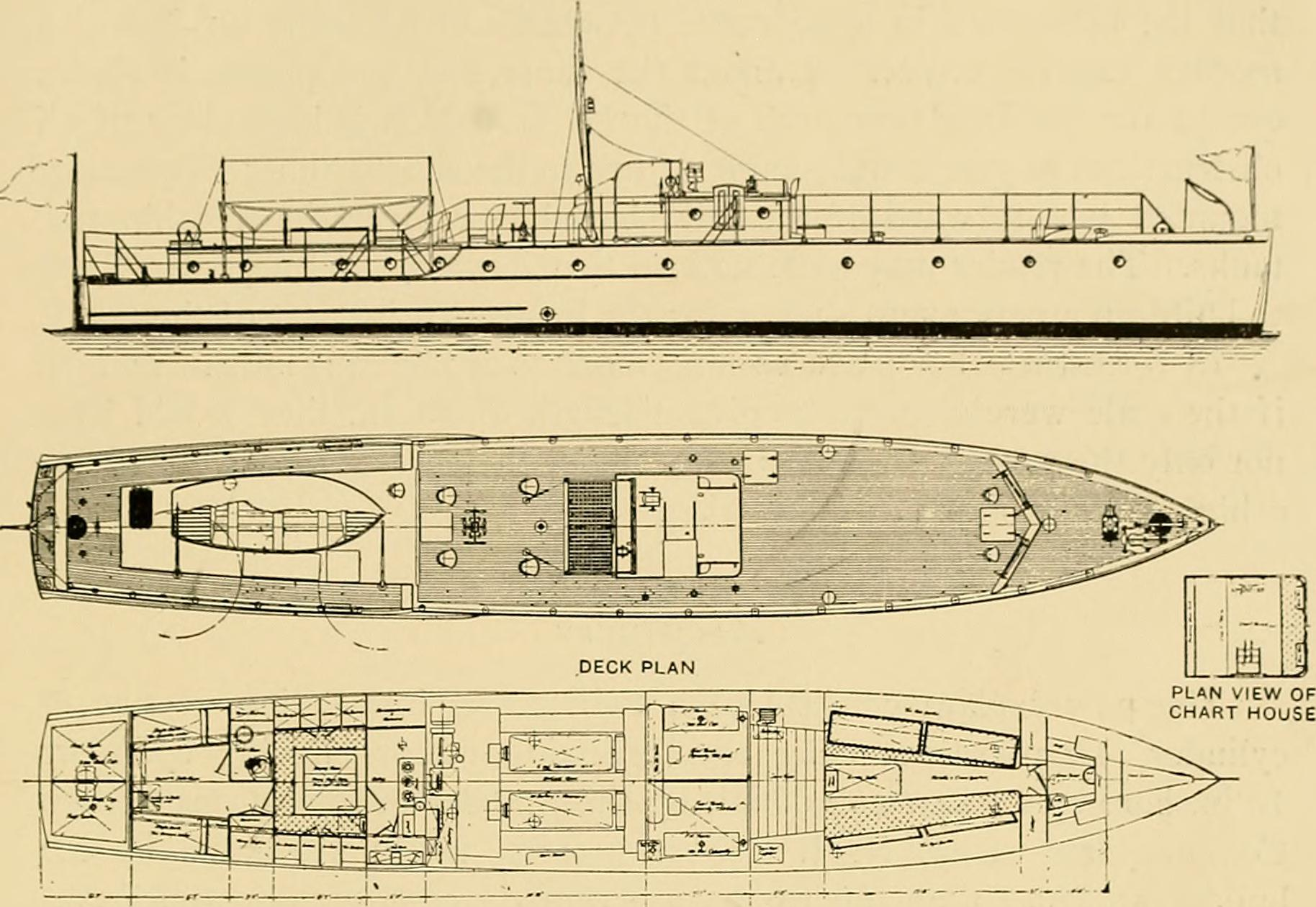
General schematic of Motor Launch patrol boats

ORP Myśliwy was a Polish patrol boat of the British Motor Launch type, originally built during World War I and later used by the Polish Navy during the interwar period. Constructed for the Royal Navy, its service history prior to Polish acquisition is unknown. Purchased by Poland in 1921, it underwent repairs and was assigned to the commander of Naval Aviation to support seaplane operations. In 1922, it became the flagship of Fleet Commander Jerzy Świrski. Persistent engine issues limited its operations, keeping it mostly stationed at the Puck naval port. It was decommissioned in 1925.

== Construction ==
The growing threat of German submarines during World War I prompted Allied navies to bolster their anti-submarine warfare capabilities. In February 1915, Henry R. Sutphen of the Electric Boat Company presented the British Admiralty in New York with a design for a small patrol boat capable of reaching 19 knots and armed with a rapid-fire naval gun. Its primary role was to counter Imperial German Navy submarines. The Royal Navy ordered an initial batch of 50 boats in April 1915, eventually commissioning 550 units by November 1916. These boats, known as Motor Launch type, were colloquially called "Movies" or "Sutphens", after the Electric Boat director.

The boats were primarily built by the Electric Launch Company (Elco) in Bayonne, with additional production at a Montreal shipyard in Canada due to capacity constraints. Engineers Irvin Chase and Thomas S. Hanson, president of the Bayonne facility, oversaw production. Artistic metalwork by a specialized firm gave the boats elegant finishes. As the United States remained neutral, components were shipped by rail to the Davie Shipyard in Quebec for assembly. Four boats were loaded per transport ship and sent to the United Kingdom. In June 1917, the Royal Navy ordered an additional 30 units, delivered by February 1918. Designated ML (Motor Launch) with numbers from 1 to 580, each boat cost an average of £8,609.

The boats served primarily in British coastal waters, with some deployed to the Mediterranean Sea, West Indies, and White Sea. Their roles included coastal reconnaissance, anti-submarine operations, mine sweeping, and laying smoke screens. The French Navy received 41 boats, designated V.1–73 (Vedettes moteur). After the war, most were sold off, often at low prices: 200 for £275 each, 95 for £263 each, and 32 for Malta at £50 each.

== Design ==
ORP Myśliwy had a wooden hull measuring 24.6 metres in length overall, 3.9 metres in beam, and 1.6 metres in draft. Constructed from oak and pitch pine with distinctive brass fittings, its elegant design made it suitable as a flagship. The displacement was 37 tons. Propulsion came from two six-cylinder gasoline engines by Standard Lyons Atlas Company, each producing 220 horsepower (440 hp total), driving two three-bladed propellers. The maximum speed was 19 knots, with an economical speed of 15 knots. The range was 750 nautical miles at maximum speed and 1,000 nautical miles at economical speed. Fuel tanks held 7,948 litres of gasoline. A two-cylinder auxiliary engine powered a dynamo, and the boat was equipped with a compressor and fire pump.

The engines, advanced for their time, required constant maintenance by two mechanics, needing regular oiling and adjustments. They were noisy and prone to ignition issues when cold or overheated. Operating at full power caused hull vibrations, and spare parts were scarce. The crew consisted of one officer and 10 non-commissioned officers and sailors. In British service, the boat was armed with a 47 mm Hotchkiss gun, Lewis guns, depth charges, and naval mines. In Polish service, it initially carried one MG 08 medium machine gun until 1923, when it was rearmed with a 47 mm Hotchkiss wz. 85 gun.

== Service ==
Commanders of ORP Myśliwy
Cpt. Mieczysław Rudnicki	30 July 1921	1923
Ens. Augustyn Szulc	20 January 1923	1924
Lt. Stefan de Walden	1924	1924

In summer 1920, the Department for Naval Affairs received an offer from St. i A. Leszczyński to purchase a surplus Allied motor boat in the Gdańsk port. In January 1921, the Department for Naval Affairs offered $12,000 for the Motor Launch patrol boat. Its prior service – whether with the Royal Navy or French Navy – is uncertain due to missing documentation. It likely originated from the Royal Navy, as the British sold disarmed units cheaply to private buyers, often for use as yachts. Historian Jan Piwowoński suggests a French origin but provides a British serial number without evidence. The boat's original designation is unknown, but its displacement suggests it was from the second series (ML 550–580).

The boat was towed to Gdańsk and docked at the Danziger Werft shipyard for repairs, including relocating the forward mast ahead of the bridge. On 7 April 1921, the Department for Naval Affairs named it ORP Myśliwy. It was commissioned as a guard ship on 30 July 1921, under Captain Mieczysław Rudnicki. Summer trials revealed poor engine performance, initially attributed to the crew but later traced to engine defects. Due to these issues, the boat was assigned to the Naval Aviation commander to support seaplane takeoffs and landings. On 1 April 1922, it was designated the flagship of Fleet Commander Jerzy Świrski. Based in Puck, it maintained communication between ships at the roadstead and Fleet Command, serving representational duties and requiring special permission to leave port. The staff motorboat M-56 handled regular shore-to-ship communication due to Myśliwy's engine problems.

From 30 May to 22 June 1922, the boat underwent repairs, with ORP Rybitwa serving as flagship. In 1923, Ensign Augustyn Szulc became commander. On 29 April 1923, it was scheduled to participate in the opening of the Temporary Naval Port and Fishermen's Shelter in Gdynia, carrying dignitaries and foreign guests, but a minesweeper was designated as a backup due to frequent breakdowns. Until 1924, it served representational roles. In 1924–1925, it joined the Training Squadron, resumed seaplane support, and served as an artillery training ship for 47 mm gun exercises. Under Lieutenant Stefan de Walden from 15 August 1924, it began active service, but its deteriorating condition led to dismantling in autumn 1925. Armament, deck equipment, and machinery were removed to storage.

On 15 January 1926, Minister of Military Affairs General Lucjan Żeligowski ordered ORP Myśliwy struck from the naval list, transferring its establishment to ORP Ślązak. The Naval Directorate was tasked with repurposing the hull, mechanisms, and equipment. The crew was reassigned to ORP Ślązak.

The fate of the decommissioned hull is unclear. One account suggests it was sold to Finland, while another claims it was broken up for firewood.
