= Vice admiral =

Senior naval officer

Vice admiral is a senior naval flag officer rank, usually equivalent to lieutenant general and air marshal. A vice admiral is typically senior to a rear admiral and junior to an admiral.

== Australia ==
In the Royal Australian Navy, the rank of vice admiral is held by the Chief of Navy and, when the positions are held by navy officers, by the Vice Chief of the Defence Force, the Chief of Joint Operations, and/or the Chief of Capability Development Group.

Vice admiral is the equivalent of air marshal in the Royal Australian Air Force and lieutenant general in the Australian Army.

== Canada ==
In the Royal Canadian Navy, the rank of vice-admiral (VAdm) (vice-amiral or Vam in French) is equivalent to lieutenant-general of the Canadian Army and Royal Canadian Air Force. A vice-admiral is a flag officer, the naval equivalent of a general officer. A vice-admiral is senior to a rear-admiral and major general, and junior to an admiral and general.

The rank insignia of a Canadian vice-admiral is as follows:

- On the navy blue mess dress jacket and the navy blue service dress tunic: the cuff insignia is one wide gold braid below two standard size gold braids, the superior one includes the executive curl.
- On tropical white mess dress and tropical white service dress tunic: three silver maple leaves, beneath silver crossed sword and baton, all surmounted by a St. Edward's Crown located on gold shoulder boards.

Two rows of gold oak leaves are located on the black visor of the white service cap. From 1968 to June 2010, the navy blue service dress tunic featured only a wide gold braid around the cuff with three gold maple leaves, beneath crossed sword and baton, all surmounted by a St. Edward's Crown located on cloth shoulder straps.

Vice-admirals are addressed by rank and name; thereafter by subordinates as "Sir" or "Ma'am". Vice-admirals are normally entitled to a staff car; the car will normally bear a flag, dark blue with three gold maple leaves arranged one over two.

A vice-admiral generally holds only the most senior command or administrative appointments, barring only Chief of Defence Staff, which is held by a full admiral or general. Appointments held by vice-admirals may include:

- Vice Chief of the Defence Staff (VCDS);
- Deputy Chief of Defence Staff (DCDS);
- Commander of an operational command (such as Canadian Joint Operations Command);
- Commander of the Royal Canadian Navy; (Currently a Vice-Admiral)
- Assistant Deputy Minister (ADM) of Defence in various capacities;
- Commander of, or representative to, a multinational force, alliance, or treaty organization.

Charles III holds the honorary rank of vice admiral in the Royal Canadian Navy.

== France ==
In France, vice-amiral is the most senior of the ranks in the French Navy; higher ranks, vice-amiral d'escadre and amiral, are permanent functions, styles and positions (in French rangs et appellations) given to a vice-amiral-ranking officer. The vice-amiral rank used to be an OF-8 rank in NATO charts, but nowadays, it is more an OF-7 rank.

The rank of vice-amiral d'escadre (literally, "squadron vice-admiral", with more precision, "fleet vice-admiral") equals a NATO OF-8 rank.

In the ancien régime Navy, between 1669 and 1791. The office of "Vice-Admiral of France" (Vice-amiral de France) was the highest rank, the supreme office of "Admiral of France" being purely ceremonial.

Distinct offices were :

- 1669–1791 Vice-admiral of the West (Atlantic Ocean).
- 1669–1791 Vice-admiral of the East (Mediterranean Sea).
- 1778–1791 Vice-admiral of the Asian and American Seas (American shores).
- 1784–1788 Vice-admiral of the Indian Seas (Indian Ocean).

=== Vice-amiral commandant ===
Vice-amiral commandant (literally, "commander of the vice admiral) was unofficial rank in World War I. At the time France had the two-rank system of flag officers; as a temporary measure, to bring its system into alignment with the rank system of flag officers of other countries, it is distingunished by wearing a 3mm silver line on the 3-star cap. Such vice admirals enjoyed the status and treatment of full admirals.

== Philippines ==
In the Philippines, the rank vice admiral is the highest-ranking official of the Philippine Navy. He is recognized as the flag officer in-command of the navy, an equivalent post to the Chief of Naval Operations in the U.S. Navy.

== Poland ==
Before World War II, the vice admiral was the highest rank in the Polish Navy. Józef Unrug was one of the only two officers to achieve the rank. The other was Jerzy Świrski. Poland had only one sovereign sea port, Port of Gdynia, and was slowly building a small modern navy that was to be ready by 1950. The navy was not a priority for obvious reasons. At present, it is a "two-star" rank. The stars are not used; however, the stars were used in between 1952 and 1956 and are still used in the vice admiral's pennant.

== United Kingdom ==
In the Royal Navy the rank of vice-admiral should be distinguished from the office of "Vice-Admiral of the United Kingdom", which is an Admiralty position usually held by a retired "full" admiral, and that of "Vice-Admiral of the Coast", a now obsolete office dealing with naval administration in each of the maritime counties.

== National ranks ==
- Vizeadmiral
- Vice admiral (India)
- Vice admiral (Sri Lanka)
- Vice admiral (Sweden)
- Vice admiral (United States)

== NATO code ==
While the rank of vice admiral is used in most of NATO countries, it is ranked differently depending on the country.

NATO code	Country	English equivalent	
NATO code	Country	UK	US
OF-8	Belgium, Bulgaria, Canada, Croatia, Denmark, Estonia, Germany, Latvia, Lithuania, Montenegro, the Netherlands, Norway, Portugal Romania, Slovenia	Vice admiral	Vice admiral
OF-7	Albania, France, Poland, Spain	Rear admiral	Rear admiral

== Gallery ==
Nënadmiral
(Albanian Naval Force)

Vice-almirante
(Angolan Navy)

Vicealmirante
(Argentine Navy)

Vice admiral
(Royal Australian Navy)

Vitse-admiral
(Azerbaijani Navy)

ভাইস এ্যাডমিরাল
Bhā'isa ēyāḍamirāla
(Bangladesh Navy)

Vice-admiraal
(Belgian Navy)

Vice-amiral
(Benin Navy)

Vicealmirante
(Bolivian Navy)

Vice-almirante
(Brazilian Navy)

Вицеадмирал
Vitseadmiral
(Bulgarian Navy)

Vice-amiral
(Cameroon Navy)

Vice-admiral
(French: Vice-amiral)
(Royal Canadian Navy)

Vicealmirante
(Chilean Navy)

Vicealmirante
(Colombian Navy)

Vice-amiral
(Navy of the DR Congo)

Vice-amiral
(Congolese Navy)

Viceadmiral
(Croatian Navy)

Vicealmirante
(Cuban Revolutionary Navy)

Viceadmiral
(Royal Danish Navy)

Vicealmirante
(Dominican Navy)

Vicealmirante
(Ecuadorian Navy)

Vicealmirante
(Navy of El Salvador)

Viitseadmiral
(Estonian Navy)

Vice almirante
(Navy of Equatorial Guinea)

Vara-amiraali
(Finnish Navy)

Vice-amiral
(French Navy)

Vice-amiral
(Gabonese Navy)

Vice admiral
(Gambian Navy)

Vice admiral
(Ghana Navy)

Vizeadmiral
(German Navy)

Vicealmirante
(Honduran Navy)

Vice admiral
(Hindi: वाइस एडमिरल}, romanized: vais edamiral)
(Indian Navy)

Vice admiral
(Irish Naval Service)

Vice-amiral
(Navy of Ivory Coast)

Vice admiral
(Jamaican Coast Guard)

Вице-адмирал
Vice-admïral
(Kazakh Naval Forces)

Viceadmirālis
(Latvian Naval Forces)

Viceadmirolas
(Lithuanian Naval Force)

Vice-amiral
(Madagascar Navy)

Vicealmirante
(Mexican Navy)

Vice admiral
(Montenegrin Navy)

Vice-amiral
(Royal Moroccan Navy)

Vice-almirante
(Mozambique Naval Command)

Vice admiral
(Namibian Navy)

Vice-admiraal
(Royal Netherlands Navy)

Vice admiral
(Royal New Zealand Navy)

Vice admiral
(Nigerian Navy)

Viseadmiral
(Royal Norwegian Navy)

Vice admiral
(Urdu: وائس ایڈمرل, romanized: wais admiral)
(Pakistan Navy)

Vicealmirante
(Paraguayan Navy)

Vicealmirante
(Peruvian Navy)

Wiceadmirał
(Polish Navy)

Vice-almirante
(Portuguese Navy)

Viceamiral
(Romanian Naval Forces)

Вице-адмирал
Vitse-admiral
(Russian Navy)

Вице Адмирал
Vice admiral
(Serbian River Flotilla)

Vice admiral
(Republic of Singapore Navy)

Vice admiral
(Slovenian Navy)

Vice admiral
(South African Navy)

Vice almirante
(Spanish Navy)

Vice admiral
(Sri Lanka Navy)

Viceamiral
(Swedish Navy)

Vice admiral
(Tanzania Naval Command)

Vice-amiral
(Togolese Navy)

Vice-amiral
(Tunisia Navy)

Wise-admiral
(Turkmen Naval Forces)

Віце-адмірал
Vitse-admiral
(Ukrainian Navy)

Vice admiral
(Royal Navy)

Vice admiral
(United States Navy)

Vice admiral
(United States Coast Guard)

Vicealmirante
(National Navy of Uruguay)

Vicealmirante
(Bolivarian Navy of Venezuela)

== See also ==
- Comparative military ranks
