= Tadeusz Morgenstern-Podjazd =

Polish naval officer

Tadeusz Józef Roman Morgenstern-Podjazd
- Born: November 9, 1895; Czernowitz, Duchy of Bukovina, Austria-Hungary, (modern Chernivtsi, Ukraine)
- Died: October 5, 1973 (aged 77); London, United Kingdom
- Occupation: Naval officer
- Years active: 1913–1945
- Known for: Helping to recreate the Polish Navy

Tadeusz Józef Roman Morgenstern-Podjazd (November 9, 1895 – October 5, 1973) was a Polish naval officer who was one of the founders of the Navy of the Polish Second Republic and who served as the deputy commander of the Navy between September 1941 and October 1942.

== In Austrian service ==
Morgenstern-Podjazd was born into an upper-class Polish family in Czernowitz (modern Chernivtsi, Ukraine) in the province of Bukovina in the Austrian empire. His family was of German origin and had become assimilated into Polish society. His father Roman had fought in the January Uprising against Russian rule in 1863 and fled into the Austrian empire after the defeat of the rising. Many of the Polish ziemianie (gentry) and szlachta (noble) families under the Austrian Empire were loyal to the House of Habsburg and in the 19th and early 20th centuries it was very common for the sons of the ziemianie and szlachta families to join the Imperial Austrian Navy. At least part of the preference of Polish elite families for the Austrian Navy as opposed to the Army was due to the greater possibility of promotion for Poles within the Navy as both the Austrian and Magyar aristocracy preferred the Army.

After graduating from the local gymnasium (a high school that serves as preparation for university in German-speaking countries), Morgenstern-Podjazd studied the law at the University of Lemberg in Lemberg (modern Lviv, Ukraine) in what was then the Austrian province of Galicia. He graduated from the University of Krakow and studied for two semesters at University of Vienna in 1913. He joined the Imperial Austrian Navy and was trained at the Imperial and Royal Naval Academy at Fiume (present-day Rijeka, Croatia) on the Adriatic Sea, from which he graduated. He reached the rank of lieutenant and served on the cruiser Helgoland and the battleship Habsburg in World War I against the Italian Regia Marina in the Adriatic. In October 1917, he completed an underwater diving course. After the dissolution of the Austrian empire in 1918, he joined the newly founded Polish Army, serving in the Naval Section of the Polish general staff.

== Under the Second Republic ==
On November 27, 1918, he reported to duty in Warsaw as one of three naval lieutenants assigned to the Polish general staff. From May 2, 1919, he served as an aide to Admiral Kazimierz Porębski. On February 10, 1920, he took part in the ceremony named Poland's Wedding to the Sea at Puck where General Józef Haller dropped a ring into the Baltic to symbolise that Poland once again had access to the sea. In the early 20th century navalism was seen as a symbol of great power status owing to the vast popularity of the 1890 book The Influence of Sea Power Upon History by the American historian Alfred Thayer Mahan who argued that whatever power that was the greatest sea power was also the world's greatest power. Through Mahan had written The Influence of Sea Power Upon History primarily with the aim of influencing Congress to vote for more money for the U.S. Navy, his book was very popular in both Europe and Asia. The Wedding to the Sea saw Haller deliver a speech envisioning Poland as having a fleet of two battleships, six cruisers and twenty-eight destroyers, a goal that proved to be impractical owing to the financial problems. Mahan had considerable disdain for the guerre de course strategy of attacking an enemy's merchant fleet and much preferred a strategy of a large fleet centered around battleships that would win a decisive battle of annihilation against its opponents. The influence of Mahan led navies around the world to be focused on the traditional battleship-centric fleet, which was more costly and expensive than a fleet designed for a guerre de course strategy. Polish naval thinking in the interwar period tended towards the Mahanian concept of a fleet strong enough to dominate the Baltic and allow ships from Poland's ally France to enter the Baltic to deliver supplies to Poland.

Morgenstern-Podjazd performed a variety of administrative jobs in Warsaw to recreate a navy for Poland. In July 1920, he left his staff duties to become an adjutant to Captain Konstanty Jacnicz of the Marine Regiment made up of sailors who volunteered to fight against the Red Army during the Polish-Soviet war of 1920. Starting on July 31, 1920, the Marine Regiment first saw action against the Red Army at Ostrołęka. In late 1920, he took command of the torpedo boat ORP Komendant Piłsudski in the Baltic Sea. In 1921, he became deputy commander of the gunboat ORP General Haller. In 1922 he briefly commanded a minesweeper ORP Jaskółka, and then entered officer's training course at the Officers' School of the Navy in Toruń. In the years 1925–1927 he was the head of the Department of Regulations and Training of the Polish Navy, and in 1927 he returned to the Naval Officer's School as director of science. In 1928, Morgenstern-Podjazd who was fluent in French served on the French destroyer Ouragan to learn about how to command a destroyer. From 1928 to 1933 he commanded successively the torpedo boat ORP Krakowiak and the destroyer ORP Wicher. In 1930, the Wicher had been completed in a French shipyard at Blainville-sur-Orne and Morgenstern-Podjazd was appointed her first captain whose assignment was to bring her to Poland. France and Poland had signed an alliance in 1921, and throughout the Second Republic era, French influence on the Polish military was strong with most of the Polish Navy's warships being built in French shipyards.

A supporter of the Sanation regime, Morgenstern-Podjazd was close to Marshal Józef Piłsudski and in 1931 as the captain of the Wicher took Piłsudski on his holiday to Portugal. In 1932 as the captain of the Wicher, Morgenstern-Podjazd played a central role in the Danzig crisis, taking the Wicher into the harbour of the Free City of Danzig (modern Gdańsk, Poland) over the objections of the Senate of the Free City. Morgenstern-Podjazd later recalled: "I was supposed to respond to any incidents from Gdańsk with all available means, including weapons." In 1933, he was appointed commander of the Naval Cadet School in Toruń. In 1938 he became the first captain of the destroyer ORP Błyskawica, and in the same year he took command of the destroyer squadron based in Gdynia. On 28 February 1939, as commander of the destroyer ORP Grom, the ship was run around, which led to him being demoted. In April–July 1939, he was deputy commander of the Hel Fortified Area. In July 1939, he was appointed commander of the Naval Cadet School in Bydgoszcz. As the Danzig crisis moved towards its climax in the summer of 1939, the atmosphere at Bydgoszcz was tense with Morgenstern-Podjazd having the cadets conduct "field exercises" against the activities of the local volksdeutsch (ethnic German) community, many of whom were spying for Germany.

== World War Two ==
When Germany invaded Poland on September 1, 1939, Morgenstern-Podjazd sent the cadets to fight in the defense of Horodyszcze and on 19 September he had the school blown up to prevent it from falling into German hands. During the course of the campaign, Mrogenstern-Podjazd had his cadets pulled back successively to Pińsk and then to Horodyszcze. On September 11, 1939, he was told to send his cadets to join the hasty formed naval battalions to fight the invading German forces. The order to retreat to Pińsk turned out to be impractical when the Soviet Union invaded Poland on September 17, 1939. On September 23, 1939, he fled into Hungary, where he was interned. Through he did not know it at the time, this would be the last time he was to see Poland. On October 23, 1939, he was able to escape from Hungary into Romania where in common with many other Polish military personnel, he was not interned by the regime of King Carol II and instead permitted to go on to France.

After a short stay in Bucharest, Morgenstern-Podjazd arrived in Paris to report to the government-in-exile. In December 1939, he was appointed the first Polish naval attache to Sweden, arriving in Stockholm on December 17, 1939. In Sweden he engaged in intelligence-gathering about German naval activities in the Baltic. As the Kriegsmarine normally performed its training in the Baltic while one of its main bases were located in Kiel, much of the information that Morgenstern-Podjazd forwarded to London was listed by the British as either B intelligence ("of value") or A intelligence ("of considerable value"). As the Kriegsmarine always performed the sea trials for new U-boats in the Baltic, his information about the sea trials was especially useful for the British as it allowed them to estimate the number of new U-boats about to enter the Atlantic Ocean.

During the September campaign of 1939, three Polish submarines had fled across the Baltic to Sweden where the boats and their crews were interned after the submarines stayed over the 48 hour limit. As naval attache, Morgenstern-Podjazd was deeply concerned about the Swedish treatment of the interned Polish sailors and frequently visited them to ensure that the Swedes were treating them humanely. The Swedish economy was very closely integrated into the German economy, and for much of World War Two Sweden was to lean in a pro-German neutrality as Sweden was heavily dependent upon German businesses to keep its economy functioning. Morgenstern-Podjazd spent much time taking up complaints from the Polish sailors with the Swedish government, whom he accused of violating various aspects of international law in its treatment of the interned sailors in order to curry favor with the Reich.

In the summer of 1941, a scandal broke out when Commander Bogusław Krawczyk of the Polish submarine ORP Wilk committed suicide on July 19, 1941. In response to the scandal, General Władysław Sikorski, the prime minister of the government-in-exile came into conflict with Admiral Jerzy Świrski and his deputy Commander Karol Korytowski. Sikorski had wanted to sack Admirał Świrski, but was prevented from doing so by objections from the British Royal Navy who argued that Świrski was the most experienced Polish admiral and there was no one to replace him. Morgenstern-Podjazd was appointed to replace Korytowski as Świrski's deputy. In September 1941, he flew on a British bomber to Great Britain and on September 10, 1941, took up command as Swirski's deputy. Morgenstern-Podjazd's relations with Świrski were strained and on January 23, 1942, he attempted to resign, saying he simply could not work with Świrski. His resignation was rejected by Sikorski who urged to find a way to learn how to co-operate with Świrski. On October 15, 1942, he resigned to become the Polish naval attache to the United States. He was to remain in Washington DC until June 1945.

During his time in Washington, his main duty was in arranging liaison between the ships of the Polish Navy and the United States Navy assigned to the convoy duty on the "North Atlantic run" that saw merchantmen take supplies and men from North America to the United Kingdom. In September 1945, he took command of the naval training school ORP Bałtyk in Okehampton. In common with most of the other Polish naval officers, Morgenstern-Podjazd was greatly embittered by Poland losing its independence and saw the outcome of the war as a defeat for his country.

== In exile ==
Morgenstern-Podjazd chose not to return to Communist Poland and in 1949 he was elected president of the Navy Association. A painter, some of the watercolors that he painted were exhibited in at a local art gallery in Ottawa, Canada. During his exile, Morgenstern-Podjazd published articles in various Polish emigre magazines and spoke on Radio Free Europe to criticise the Communist regime. In 1964, General Władysław Anders appointed him Rear Admiral. He was interviewed by the journalist Eugeniusz Romiszewski for a documentary that aired on the Polish channel of Radio Free Europe on May 12, 1968, about the 1932 crisis. Morgenstern-Podjazd died in exile in London and is buried in Putney Vale Cemetery.

== Promotions ==
- Porucznik marynarki (Lieutenant junior grade) - 1918
- Kapitan marynarki (Lieutenant) - 1921
- Komandor podporucznik (Lieutenant commander) - 3 May 1926
- Komandor porucznik (Commander) - 1 January 1932
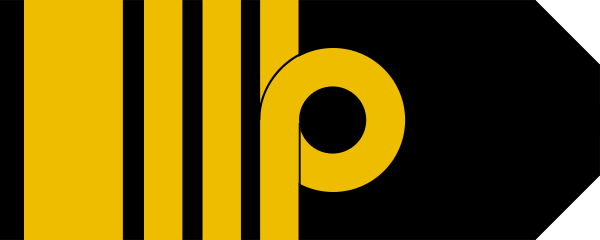
- Komandor (Captain) - 19 March 1938
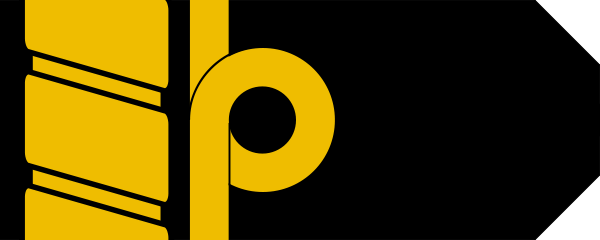
- Kontradmirał (Commodore) - 1 January 1964

== Awards and decorations ==
- Silver Cross of Virtuti Militari (1921)
- Knight's Cross of Order of Polonia Restituta (11 November 1937)
- Cross of Valour (twice)
- Golden Cross of Merit (19 March 1931)
- Commander of the Order of the Sword (Sweden, 1932)
- Chevalier of the Legion of Honour (France, 1931)
- Knight of the Order of the Dannebrog (Denmark)

== Books and articles ==
- Kryska-Karski, Tadeusz; Żurakowski, Stanisław (1991). Generałowie Polski niepodległej. Warsaw: Editions Spotkania.
- Stirling, Tessa (2005). Intelligence Co-operation Between Poland and Great Britain During World War II. London: Vallentine Mitchell. ISBN 8389115379.
- Kitowski, Zygmunt (Fall 2017). "Faculty of Mechanical and Electrical Engineering of the Polish Naval Academy-Eighty Five Years of Training and Scientific Research Part 1: 1931-1955". Zeszty Naukowe Akademii Marynakrki Wojennej. 211 (4): 89–112.
- Stoker, Donald (2003). Britain, France and the Naval Arms Trade in the Baltic, 1919 -1939: Grand Strategy and Failure. London: Routledge. ISBN 1135774226.
