= Danzig crisis (1932) =

1932 diplomatic incident between Poland and Danzig

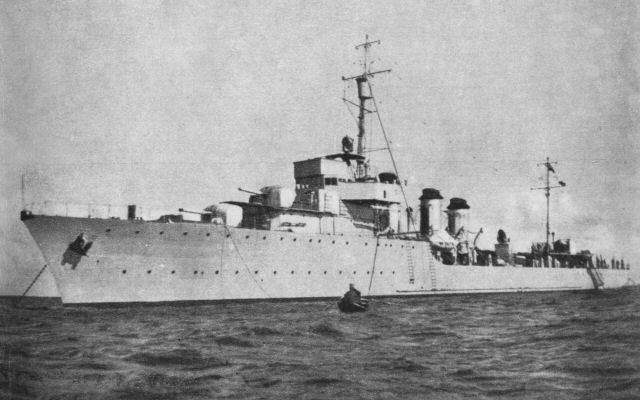
- The Polish destroyer Wicher
Date	14 June 1932
Location	Free City of Danzig (modern Gdańsk, Poland)
Result	Polish diplomatic victory

Belligerents
Poland	Free City of Danzig

The Danzig crisis of 1932 was an incident between the Free City of Danzig (modern Gdańsk, Poland) and Poland concerning whether the Polish government had the right to station warships in Danzig harbour, together with Poland's claim to represent Danzig with foreign powers. The incident was sparked on 14 June 1932 when a squadron of British destroyers visited Danzig and was greeted by the Polish destroyer Wicher which had entered Danzig harbour without the permission of the Senate of the Free City. The incident led to the Danzig authorities reluctantly granting Poland the right to station its warships in Danzig, the renewal of the agreement governing Polish rights in the Free City and a shift towards navalism within Poland.

== Background ==
The American president Woodrow Wilson had issued a set of war aims known as the Fourteen Points on 8 January 1918. Point 13 called for Polish independence to be restored after the war and for Poland to have "free and secure access to the sea", a statement that implied the German deep-water port of Danzig located at a strategical location where a branch of the river Vistula flowed into the Baltic Sea should become part of Poland. At the Paris peace conference in 1919, of the "Big Three" leaders, Wilson and the French premier Georges Clémenceau supported the Polish claim to Danzig, but the British Prime Minister David Lloyd George was opposed under the grounds the population of Danzig was about 90% German. In a compromise, it was agreed that Danzig would become a Free City that would belong to neither Germany nor Poland, but the latter was to have special rights in the city. The Polish delegation to the Paris peace conference led by Roman Dmowski had asked for the cession of Danzig to Poland, and within Poland the creation of the Free City was widely seen as a betrayal of Point 13. Agreements such as the Paris convention of 1920 gave Poland certain rights with regards to the foreign relations of the Free City. Throughout the interwar period, it was widely believed that Poland was looking for any excuse to annex Danzig, and the movement of Polish military forces into the Free City was always the cause of much tension. The population of Danzig, which was 90% German at the time, never reconciled themselves to their separation from Germany and throughout the interwar period, the municipal authorities of the Free City took every opportunity to press the case for a return to the Reich.

On the part of the Baltic coast that became part of Poland, there were only two small fishing ports, Puck and Hel, neither of which were suitable as naval bases. The most suitable port was Danzig, which was largely demilitarized under the terms of the Treaty of Versailles. The League of Nations, which possessed ultimate legal authority over Danzig suggested Poland use Danzig as a port d'attache in which Poland would have the right to station warships but not to build any naval base to support the warships. On 8 October 1921, an agreement was signed giving Poland port d'attache rights in Danzig to be renewed every three years. Polish warships wintered in Danzig when the Baltic froze over and employed the shipwrights of the Free City to do repairs and maintenance work. The Polish Navy was very small in the 1920s and consisted mostly of former German torpedo boats.

With the coming of "presidential government" in Germany led by Chancellor Heinrich Brüning in 1930 came an increase in German revanchism as strident calls were made for the return of the Free City of Danzig together with the Polish corridor to the Reich. Gottfried Treviranus, the Minister of Occupied Eastern Territory in Brüning's cabinet declared in a speech at a rally outside of the Reichstag in Berlin in August 1930: "An unjust border cannot withstand international law and the national will to live. Down with the talk of catastrophe. Rally around with courage to banish all troubles. The day will come when the fight for right will free Germany and Europe!" At the same time, politics in Danzig had taken a turn towards the right with the Danzig branch of the National Socialists under the leadership of Gauleiter Albert Forster becoming the second party in the Danzig Senate on a platform of "Home to the Reich!"

In March 1931, the Senate of the Free City unilaterally terminated Poland's port d'attache rights. The dispute was referred to the Council of the League of Nations, which issued a ruling on 19 September 1931 that decreed that both parties should take their dispute to the Permanent Court of International Justice in The Hague. On December 11, 1931, the Permanent Court of International Justice ruled that the existing contracts did not constitute grounds for stationing Polish warships in Danzig. The court suggested that the two sides settle the dispute themselves. On 1 May 1932, the Senate ruled that Polish Navy's warships could not enter Danzig without permission being first obtained from the Senate.

The Free City had invited a group of Royal Navy destroyers to visit Danzig in June 1932, which brought tensions to the boil. On 30 May 1932, German Chancellor Brüning was dismissed by President Paul von Hindenburg and replaced with Franz von Papen, who was unknown to most Germans. Papen's so-called "government of the president's friends" was the most right-wing government that had been formed yet under the Weimar Republic, and it took a hard line regarding the revision of Germany's eastern frontiers. The fact that Papen's Defense Minister, Kurt von Schleicher was a serving Reichswehr general who was well known for his anti-Polish prejudices caused much alarm in Warsaw. The German radio, which was controlled by the government, had taken a hard line towards Poland in the spring of 1932, engaging in what the Polish historian Piotr Wandycz called "warlike hysteria". France, which was Poland's most important ally, supported the Polish position but also advised caution on the part of Warsaw.

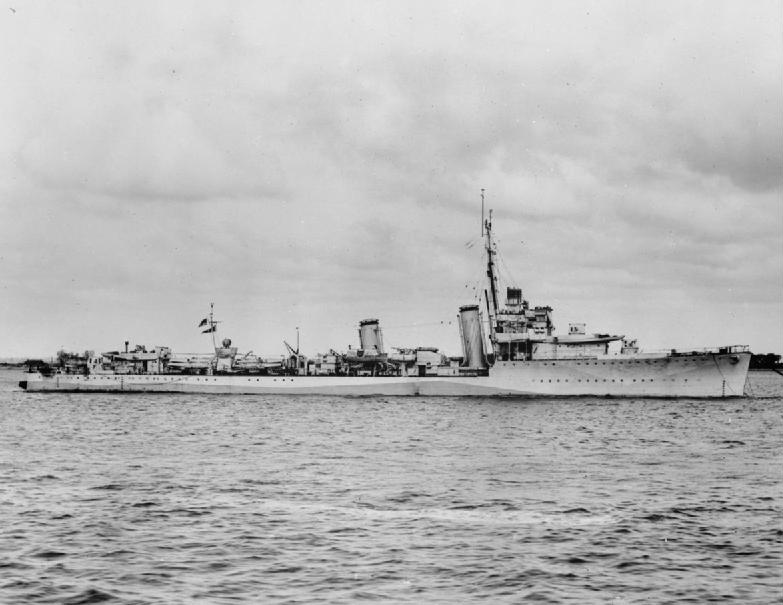
HMS Campbell in 1942. In 1932, the visit of the Campbell to Danzig was the immediate cause of the crisis.

In June 1932, the Lausanne Conference was scheduled to open to settle the question of reparations, which had been suspended since the Hoover Moratorium of June 1931. Papen who was to head the German delegation at Lausanne planned to meet with French Premier Édouard Herriot, the head of the French delegation with an offer to end French–German enmity. Papen wanted to propose a Franco-German military alliance, a customs union between France and Germany and a promise of a consultative pact in exchange for which he wanted French acceptance of Gleichberechtigung ("equality of status") to allow Germany to rearm beyond the limits set by the Treaty of Versailles. Papen also wanted an end of the Franco-Polish alliance, which would give Germany a free hand to go to war with Poland without fear of a war with France. Papen tried to make what was likely to be an unpalatable offer about France's allies in Eastern Europe more acceptable to Herriot. Papen dressed it up as an anti-Soviet move and arguing to keep the Soviets out of Eastern Europe required a militarily stronger Germany. Marshal Józef Piłsudski, Poland's de facto leader, was vaguely aware from diplomatic gossip that Papen was planning on French-German negotiations at Lausanne on the future of Europe, and he decided upon a bold action to remind the powers that Poland was not to be taken for granted.

Danzig was widely considered to be "the most dangerous city in Europe" as the Free City was a flashpoint in German-Polish relations that could cause a war at any moment. Since Poland was allied to France, any German-Polish war would automatically become a Franco-German war, thereby starting another world war. A report by a British journalist from 1932 stated: "Germany intends to have Danzig and the Corridor. I have no brief for her. I deplore the fact that several million Germans would shed blood for this cause, but since it is a fact and the Poles certainly cannot be talked out of their territory, how will the matter be settled except by arms? I believe there must be a war in Europe; the best we can hope for is that it will be over soon, and that it will not spread".

== Incident ==
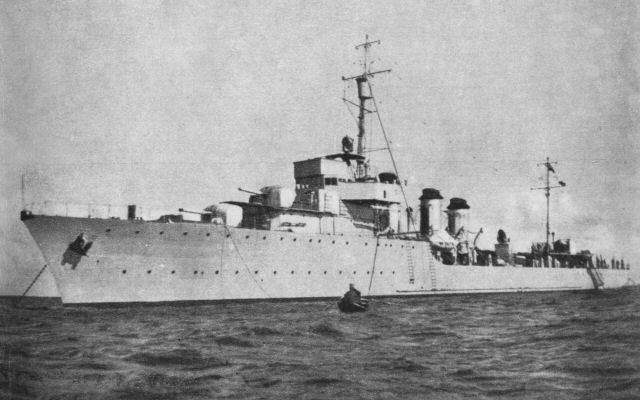
The Wicher

Marshal Piłsudski decided at the suggestion of the Deputy Polish Foreign Minister, Colonel Józef Beck, to use the upcoming visit of the British warships as a trial of strength, as he was highly concerned of the possibility of Herriot and Papen reaching a deal at Lausanne that would be prejudicial to Poland. At a meeting with the commander of the Polish Navy, Admiral Józef Unrug and the captain of the destroyer, ORP Wicher Lieutenant Commander Tadeusz Morgenstern-Podjazd, it was decided that the Wicher would serve as the host to the British squadron regardless if the Free City granted permission or not. The fact that Britain had accepted an invitation from the Free City to have the Royal Navy squadron visit Danzig without Warsaw being consulted had offended both Piłsudski and even more so Beck, who was rapidly becoming Piłsudski's favorite adviser on foreign policy. Beck tended to favor a more confrontational foreign policy than Zaleski, and the cruise of the Wicher was an early sign of a shift in Polish foreign policy. The Polish Foreign Minister August Zaleski, who was attending a session of the League of Nations in Geneva, was not informed of the planned visit of the Wicher to Danzig. Morgenstern-Podjazd was ordered to open fire in the event of any disrespect to the Polish flag by shooting at municipal buildings belonging to the Free City. Morgenstern-Podjazd had orders not to speak to Danzig officials and only to acknowledge the British. Morgenstern-Podjazd later recalled in an interview in 1968 on Radio Free Europe: "I was supposed to respond to any incidents from Gdańsk with all available means, including weapons."

On 14 June 1932, the Wicher arrived at the Danzig roads. Later the same day, the British squadron consisting of the destroyers' HMS Campbell, HMS Westminster, HMS Walpole and HMS Vidette, under the command of Commander Henry Pridham-Wippell, arrived in the evening. The tight schedule made it impossible to make the planned courtesy mutual visits at sea, and Morgenstern-Podjazd decided to welcome the British in the harbour of Danzig. The Polish commissioner to Danzig, Kazimierz Papée, informed the Senate that the Wicher would be entering the harbour regardless of its feelings about the matter. Pridham-Wippell was not certain if he should exchange visits with the Wicher since the Senate had refused permission for the Wicher to enter the harbour, but the British consul in Danzig advised him to go ahead. In addition, Count Manfredi di Gravina, the Italian diplomat who served as the League of Nations Commissioner for Danzig, advised Pridham-Wippell to exchange visits with Morgenstern-Podjazd. Gravina was unpopular with the Poles, who accused him of being biased toward Germany.

On 15 June 1932, at about 9:30 am, amid much tension, the Wicher and the Royal Navy squadron entered the harbour over the protests of the Senate. The Wicher was anchored at a quay in Danzig until the afternoon. Morgenstern-Podjazd paid a visit to Pridham-Wippell aboard the Campbell, and Pridham-Wippell, in turn, visited the Wicher. Both the Wicher and the British ships left Danzig at the same time. As the Polish flag was not disrespected, Morgenstern-Podjazd did not fire a shot in anger.

Reaction at the League of Nations to the visit of Wicher to Danzig was highly unfavourable, but Zaleski put up an able defence at Geneva. The French were also offended by Piłsudski's move and complained that he had given no advance notice of the Wicher's visit, which led Zaleski to tell French diplomats that he had received no advance notice either. Being in Geneva, Zaleski promptly met Sir Eric Drummond, the Secretary General of the League of Nations, to ask the League to pressure the Free City to settle the port issue. In exchange, Zaleski promised not to send the Wicher back into the harbour. Zaleski noted that the old German battleship Schlesien was scheduled to visit Danzig later that year, and argued if the port d'attache issue was resolved, Poland would avoid making difficulties about the visit of the Schlesien, which was likely to lead to demonstrations in Danzig demanding its return to Germany. In turn, such demonstrations might lead to clashes with Polish forces, which would be embarrassing for Papen, who would come under pressure at home to take action since he was very unpopular. In particular, Zaleski promised Drummond that the Wicher would not be sent into the harbour at the same time as the Schlesien visited, thereby preventing an incident that could easily lead to a German-Polish war. Zaleski's offer that if the port d'attache issue was resolved in a manner satisfactory to Poland, in exchange for Poland not objecting to the visit of the Schlesien, resolved the dispute. Papen brought pressure on the Senate to accept the Polish offer.

At the Lausanne Conference, Herriot agreed to cancel reparations but declined Papen's offer of an economic union and a military alliance as he did not trust him. The fact that the German economy was three times larger than the French economy meant that in any French-German economic union, Germany would be the senior partner and France the junior partner.

== Aftermath ==
The demonstration of Polish strength had its effect, and on 13 August 1932, a new agreement was signed allowing the Polish Navy to use the harbour. The new agreement dropped the term port d'attache and gave the Polish Navy greater refueling and maintenance rights, but the unfriendly attitude of the Free City and the Treaty of Versailles ruled out the possibility of a permanent naval base. After the agreement was signed, Pierre Bressy, the French chargé d'affaires in Warsaw, congratulated Zaleski for Poland's handling of the crisis. Zaleski replied that the methods employed were not to his taste, but "one had to recognize that under the circumstances, Marshal Piłsudski had a happy inspiration". The purpose of sending the Wicher to Danzig was largely to remind the French not to take Poland for granted as Herriot considered Papen's proposal for a new Franco-German relationship and so the voyage of the Wicher achieved its purpose. Wandycz wrote that sending the Wicher to Danzig was risky, especially with the orders to open fire on municipal buildings if the Polish flag was disrespected, which might have turned world opinion against Poland. However, Piłsudski's gamble had paid off.

The 1932 incident was the only case of Poland engaging in what might be called gunboat diplomacy, with the Ministry of Foreign Affairs using the navy to achieve diplomatic objectives. The incident also influenced Polish attitudes towards the navy. Piłsudski had long been skeptical of its value, which tended to be underfunded. The incident led to a navalist turn in Poland, and Piłsudski increased the naval budget by ordering six-year expansion plan for the navy, consisting of two Grom-class destroyers and two Orzeł-class submarines.

== Sources ==
- Graczyk, Marcin (2007). Admirał Świrski. Gdańsk: Finna Publishing House. ISBN 978-83-89929-82-2.
- Hargreaves, Richard (2010). Blitzkrieg Unleashed: The German Invasion of Poland, 1939. Mechanicsburg: Stackpole Books. ISBN 978-0811707244.
- Haferkorn, Reinhard (March 1933). "Danzig and the Polish Corridor". International Affairs. 12 (2): 224–239.
- Koszela, Witold (2013). Niszczyciele Polskiej Marynarki Wojennej. Warsaw: Alma Press. ISBN 978-83-7020-518-8.
- Kondracki, Tadeusz (2013). Niszczyciele "Wicher" i "Burza". Warsaw: Edipresse Polska. ISBN 978-83-7769-560-9.
- Makowski, Andrzej (2015). "Polsce jest potrzebna Marynarka Wojenna?". Morze, statki i okręty. 19 (9–10).
- McNamara, Paul (2009). Sean Lester, Poland and the Nazi takeover of Danzig. Dublin: Irish Academic Press. ISBN 978-0-7165-2968-2.
- O'Connell, J.J. (September 1939). "Danzig: The Case for Poland". Studies: An Irish Quarterly Review. 28 (111): 391–401.
- Piaskowski, Stanisław (1984). Kontrtorpedowce "Wicher" i "Burza". Albany: Sigma Press.
- Wandycz, Piotr Stefan (1988). The Twilight of French Eastern Alliances, 1926-1936: French-Czechoslovak-Polish Relations from Locarno to the Remilitarization of the Rhineland. Princeton: Princeton University Press. ISBN 9780691635255..
- Zawadzki, Wojciech (1998). Polska Marynarka Wojenna w latach 1918−1939.
