= Kenneth J. Hagan =

American naval historian

Kenneth James Hagan is an American naval historian and retired faculty member of the United States Naval Academy and of the Naval War College's distance education faculty located at the Naval Postgraduate School in Monterey, California.

== Early life and education ==
Born in Oakland, California on February 20, 1936, Hagan graduated with honors in history from the University of California, Berkeley, in 1958. After serving in the United States Navy from 1958 to 1963, he returned to Berkeley, where he earned his master of arts degree in 20th Century U.S. History, University of California, Berkeley, 1964. He then went on to the Claremont Graduate School, where he completed his Ph.D. in 1970. He married and had three children.

== Naval career ==
After attending the Naval Officer Candidate School, Hagan was commissioned an Ensign in 1958. Specializing as an intelligence officer, he was assigned to the Pacific Fleet, stationed on Guam and deployed to five different aircraft carriers with a photographic reconnaissance squadron in 1959–1961. Promoted to Lieutenant (junior grade) and then, Lieutenant, he taught intelligence subjects at the Pacific Fleet Operational Intelligence Training Center at the Naval Air Station, Alameda, California, in 1961–1963. After leaving active duty, he was affiliated with various Naval Reserve Intelligence Units from 1964 to 1980, when he became Executive Officer, Naval Intelligence Command Estimates Unit 0166. He served as Editor, Naval Intelligence Quarterly in 1979, 1980, and 1982, then was Commanding Officer, Naval Intelligence Command Estimates Unit 0166 from 1982 to 1984. He retired from the Naval Reserve with the rank of Captain. From 1976, he served as curriculum advisor to the Naval Reserve Officer Training Corps and instructor for new instructors of Naval Science 202, "Sea Power and Maritime Affairs."

== Academic career ==
Hagan began his academic career as a part-time Instructor, San Bernardino Valley College on the Spring of 1965. He then served as a part-time Associate in History, University of California, Irvine, 1965–1966, before getting his first full-time appointment as instructor in the History Department at Claremont Men's College, Claremont, California, 1968–1969. In 1969, he was appointed assistant professor in the History Department at Kansas State University, where he remained until 1973. While at Kansas State, he gave a weekly graduate seminar as visiting professor at the U.S. Army Command and General Staff College, Fort Leavenworth, Kansas, 1971–1973. In 1973, the United States Naval Academy appointed him assistant professor. He was subsequently promoted to associate professor in 1977, full professor in 1987, and then archivist and director of the U.S. Naval Academy Museum in 1990. In 1994, he retired with promotion to director and professor emeritus. Returning to California, he became visiting professor at the Naval Postgraduate School in 1997–98, before being appointed Professor of Strategy at the U.S. Naval War College's Monterey Program, where he served from 1998 until his retirement in 2010.

Hagan served as President, U.S. Commission on Military History, 1992–1996; Director, Seventh Naval History Symposium, U.S. Naval Academy, 1985; Council Member and Secretary, North American Society for Oceanic History, 1976–1979; Editorial Advisory Board, Military Affairs, 1979–1982, and on the Membership Committee, Society for Historians of American Foreign Relations, 1976–1982.

== Honors and awards ==
While on naval service, Hagan received the Meritorious Unit Citation in September, 1986 and the Meritorious Service Medal in September, 1984. As an academic, he received the Navy Superior Civilian Service Award, the North American Society for Oceanic History's John Lyman Book Award for the Best Book on the History of the United States Navy in 1978 for In Peace and War. In 2015, the Naval Historical Foundation awarded him its Commodore Dudley W. Knox Naval History Lifetime Achievement Award.

== Books ==
By 2015, he had published seven books, nineteen books chapters, eleven articles and twenty-five encyclopedia entries on American naval history.

- American gunboat diplomacy and the old Navy, 1877–1889 (1973). ISBN 0837162742 OCLC 624657
- American foreign policy: a history, by Thomas G. Paterson, J. Garry Clifford, and Kenneth J. Hagan (1977, 1983, 1988, 1991, 1995, 2000, 2004, 2005, 2007, 2010). ISBN 0669946982 OCLC 3593763
- In Peace and War: Interpretations of American Naval History, edited by Kenneth J. Hagan. (1978, 1984, 2008). ISBN 9780275999537 OCLC 191732556
- Against all enemies: interpretations of American military history from colonial times to the present, edited by Kenneth J. Hagan and William R. Roberts (1986). ISBN 0313211973 OCLC 12342367
- This People's Navy: the Making of American Sea Power (1991). ISBN 0029134706 OCLC 22239857
- Unintended consequences: the United States at war, by Kenneth J. Hagen and Ian J. Bickerton (2007) ISBN 9781861893109 OCLC 74525850
- Strategy in the American War of Independence: a global approach, edited by Donald Stoker, Kenneth J. Hagan and Michael T. McMaster (2010). ISBN 9780415367349 OCLC 373060002
