= Jerzy Świrski =

Polish vice admiral (1882–1959)

Rear Admiral Jerzy Włodzimierz Świrski
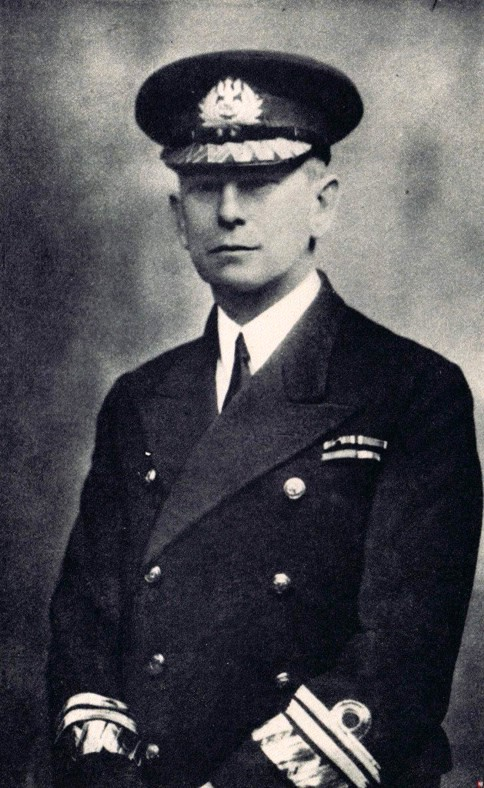
- Jerzy Świrski, head of the Polish Navy circa 1943
- Born: 5 April 1882; Kalisz, Congress Poland, Russian Empire
- Died: 12 June 1959 (aged 77); London, UK
- Military career
- Allegiance: Russian Empire (1902-1918); Ukrainian People's Republic (1918); Poland (1919-1947); United Kingdom (1939-1945)
- Branch: Imperial Russian Navy; Navy of the Ukrainian People's Republic; Polish Navy; Polish Marines under Royal Navy
- Service years: 1902–1947
- Rank: Wiceadmirał (Rear admiral)
- Commands: Chief Navigation Officer Black Sea Fleet (Imperial Russian Navy); Chief of Naval operations (Ukrainian People's Republic); Commodore (Polish fleet); Chief of the Directorate of the Polish Navy; Rear admiral Polish Naval Forces
- Conflicts: World War I; Russian Revolution; World War II
- Awards: Companion of the Order of the Bath; Grand Cross of the Order of Polonia Restituta; Gold Cross of Merit; Order of Saint Stanislaus (Poland); Order of the Cross of Liberty (Finland); Grand Officer of the Legion of Honour (France); Order of St. Vladimir (Russian Empire); Order of St. Anna (Russian Empire); Order of the Sword (Sweden); Ordre du Mérite maritime (France)

Jerzy Włodzimierz Świrski (5 April 1882, in Kalisz – 12 June 1959, in London) was a Polish rear admiral and officer in the Russian Imperial Navy and later the Polish Navy. As Chief of the Polish Naval Command (1925-1947), he was a member of an elite group of high ranking Polish naval officers from foreign navies who became founder members of the re-established naval forces of the newly independent Poland after World War I. During World War II, Polish naval forces under his command, were embedded with the Royal Navy and contributed significantly to the success of Britain's maritime war effort. He notably fell out with a Polish war time Prime Minister-in-exile, General Sikorski, but was supported by the British and survived in post. He was appointed an Honorary Knight Commander of the Order of the Bath.

== Background ==
He was born into a military family on 5 April 1882 in Kalisz, in the Russian Partition of Poland. His father, a graduate of the Moscow Cadet Corps, was an officer in the Imperial Russian Army. Świrski attended the Marine Cadet Corps School in St Petersburg from 1889 to 1902. He completed the course for Navigation officers.

=== Russian Imperial Navy service ===
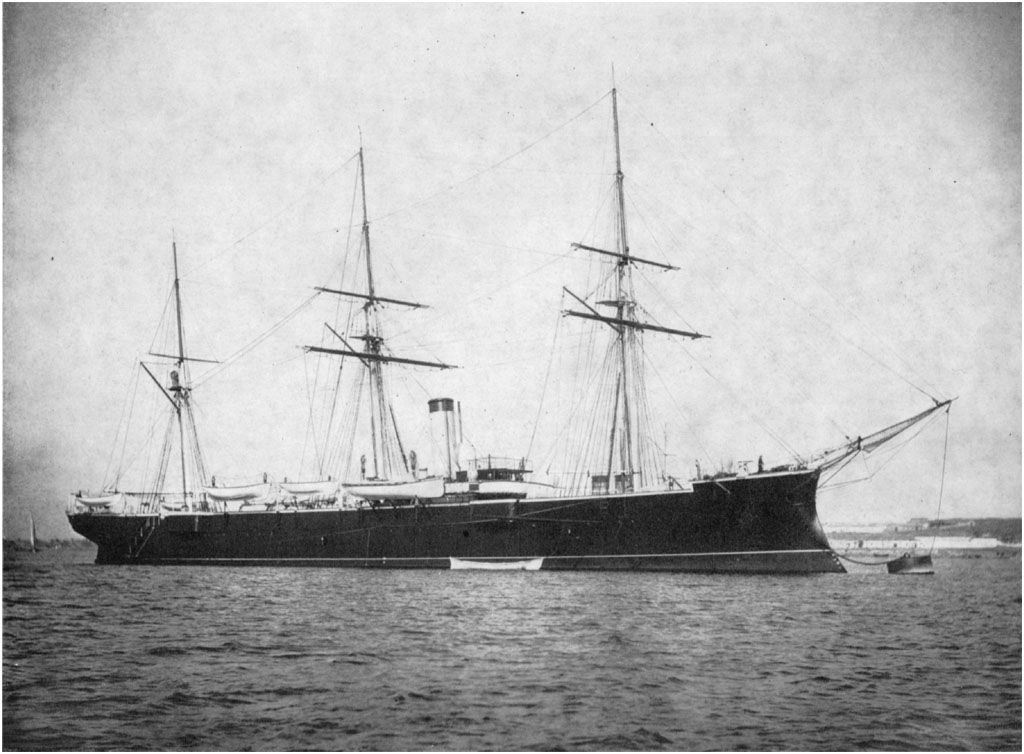
Pamyat'Merkuriya1879-1907a

As a commissioned officer in 1902, he joined the Russian Imperial Navy in the rank of Midshipman. Initially he was Watch officer and junior navigation officer on board the cruiser Askold. From 1905 he served in the Black Sea Fleet, as watch officer on the destroyer, Rostislav, on the Bug-type minelayer Dunay and on the frigate, Donetz. He was later engaged in mine laying operations and as navigation officer on the cruiser Pamiat Merkuria. During 1908 he was briefly training officer on board the mine layer, Kronstadt. Between 1909 and 1911 he returned to the Pamiat Merkuria as its navigation officer and also on the Jevstatije. Subsequently he served as navigation officer of the Russian Torpedo Division and commander of the torpedo boat, Stremitielnyi. In 1912 he advanced to navigational Flag officer of the Brigade of Naval Destroyers. From 1914 he was a member of the Training Commission for the Black Sea Fleet.

Throughout World War I he was the navigation officer of the Black Sea Fleet, rising in 1917 to the rank of Captain, then naval commander.

=== Navy of the Ukrainian People's Republic ===
In 1918 he was nominated Chief of Naval Operations of the Navy of the Ukrainian People's Republic and Minister of Naval Affairs of the Ukrainian People's Republic. That same year he was promoted to Rear admiral of the Ukrainian Hetmanate. On 17 December 1918, he resigned in protest against the cooperation of the government of the Ukrainian People's Republic with the West Ukrainian People's Republic against Poland.

== Interwar Period ==
=== Independent Poland ===
Before the end of hostilities, in December 1917, he had made contact with Polish organisations. He became an active member of the 'Polish House' in Sevastopol. After the fall of the Ukrainian People's Republic, he left for Poland, where he joined the League for the Renewal of the Polish Navy, and later went to France where he was active in the National Committee for Poland.

In 1919 he joined the Polish Army and was integrated into the Department for Maritime Affairs in Warsaw, becoming head of the Organisational Section. In July 1920 he was deputy to the chief of the Department for Maritime Affairs and was acting chief between 6 August to 5 September 1920. From September 1920 he was commander of the Coastal Force, Wybrzeże Morskie, based in Puck. In January 1921 he was confirmed in the rank of colonel of the navy and in April became a member of the Marine Corps. In February 1921 he advanced to the rank of Commander. In May 1922 he was confirmed in the rank with retrospective recognition of seniority dating from June 1919 within the Marine Corps. On 24 November 1922 the Polish Premier and the Chief of staff confirmed his status, as of 1 January 1922, as Head of the Fleet, based in Puck. In August 1924 he moved with the Fleet Command to Grabówek, Gdynia.

In May 1925 the President of Poland, Stanisław Wojciechowski released him from the Fleet Command and appointed him as chief of Marine Operations in Warsaw. In 1931 he was promoted to the rank of Rear admiral. On behalf of the Polish Treasury, he signed contracts for the procurement of naval Destroyer, Submarines and in 1938 for the Minelayer, ORP "Gryf".

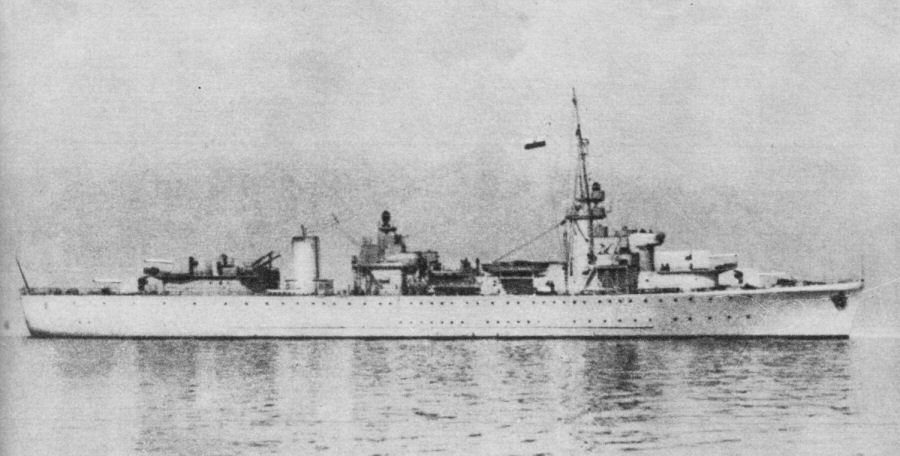
ORP Gryf (1936)

== World War II ==
On 5 September 1939 Świrski and his staff left Warsaw for Pińsk, but due to heavy bombing they diverted to the border at Kuty and crossed into Romania, arriving in Paris on 6 October. He reported to General Sikorski and presented him with a strategy for the deployment of the Polish Marines. These included the continuation of the Polish Navy as a political and naval force, including the merchant fleet, collecting personnel, organizing military transport in France and consolidating resources. Having become Chief of the Directorate of the Polish Navy in October 1939, in December Sikorski recognized the role played by the Polish Navy in the war and ordered that naval matters be concentrated under the command of its chief, Jerzy Świrski. This meant that for the first time, the Polish Navy became independent of the Army. In 1940 after the fall of France, the Polish Ministry of Military Affairs, evacuated to the United Kingdom which became the war time base of the Polish Government in Exile.

=== Polish-British Naval Agreement ===
On 18 November 1939 the British and Polish governments had signed an Anglo-Polish naval agreement and protocol laying out how their forces would co-operate. Świrski was a co-signatory of the Anglo-Polish military alliance, alongside Chief of Staff, Lieutenant General Władysław Sikorski and Ambassador Edward Bernard Raczyński. In outline Polish vessels would operate embedded within the Royal Navy, but under their own command. A note dated 6 June 1940 stated that:

"A detachment of the Polish Navy, consisting at present of three destroyers, two submarines and a depot ship, is operating in conjunction with the Royal Navy. The depot ship ORP Gdynia is stationed at Plymouth; two of the destroyers, ORP Błyskawica and Burza form part of the 1st Destroyer Flotilla and the third ORP Garland will shortly join the Mediterranean, and the two submarines, ORP Orzeł and Wilk form part of the 2nd submarine Flotilla."

Unlike the Polish army and air-force, which were largely decimated in the attack on Poland and the survivors thrown into the battle for France in 1940 to suffer further heavy casualties, the Polish Navy, initially had no shortage of manpower. Three destroyers, two submarines and two training ships, all fully manned, reached the UK. In addition Polish merchantmen contained reservists and other seamen who could be conscripted. The training ships included officer instructors and young officer cadets. In all some 800 officers and other ranks commenced naval service based in the UK.

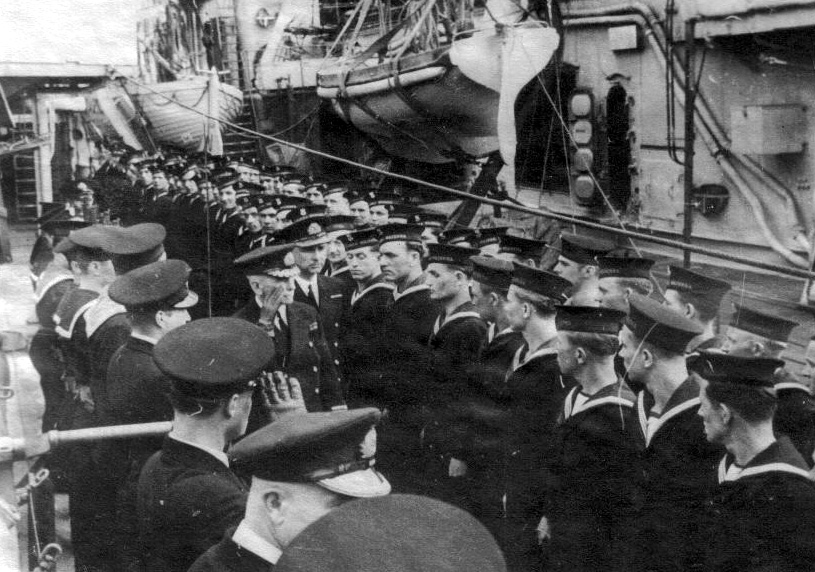
Vice-admiral Świrski with the crew of ORP "Piorun" after the battle with the Bismarck

When in 1940 the naval command, under Jerzy Świrski transferred from Paris to London, two administrative divisions were created: The North Command based in Greenock and the South Command based in Devonport. Later, the Mediterranean Command was formed after Polish naval forces had expanded to over 3,000. In 1941, shortly after his promotion to Vice admiral, differences emerged between Świrski and Sikorski who had decided to stand him down. As a result, both Świrski and his deputy, Commander Karol Korytowski were to lose their posts. The reason for the dismissals was their management and procurement style in the Marines and especially Świrski's tendency towards independent thinking. The pretext was ostensibly the death by suicide of the commander of the submarine, ORP Wilk and the submarine flotilla leader, Lieutenant Commander Bogusław Krawczyk, who opposed the admiral's management priorities.

Commander Tadeusz Morgenstern-Podjazd was called in to replace Świrski, but in the event, Świrski remained in post and Morgenstern was confirmed as his deputy. The reason was the British Admiralty could not see anyone competent enough to replace him. Świrski's loyalty towards the Allies of World War II was to earn him the Order of the Bath. In October 1942 Morgenstern resigned and Korytowski resumed his previous role.

Following Sikorski's dramatic death in an air accident off Gibraltar in July 1943, Świrski continued in his earlier role.

== Post-war ==
After the war Świrski did not return to Poland and remained in exile. He was regarded as a distinguished leader of men and as a brilliant strategist. In the history of Polish naval forces he is rated as an exceptional officer and educationalist of the younger officer corps. Among his signal achievements was his three-pronged plan to ensure the sustainability of the Polish Marines as a defence force: 1. A strategy for the establishment of an effective maritime force (1925 ), 2. The concept of Polish Marines closely shadowing and cooperating with the Royal Navy (1939) 3. Preparing the Marines for post-war effectiveness (1943). He died in June 1959 in London and is buried there in Brompton Cemetery.

A memorial plaque in his honour was unveiled in St Michael Archangel church at Oksywie, Gdynia in 1983. A similar plaque was unveiled in the Polish Naval Cemetery in Gdynia to mark the 80th anniversary of the formation of the Polish Marines.

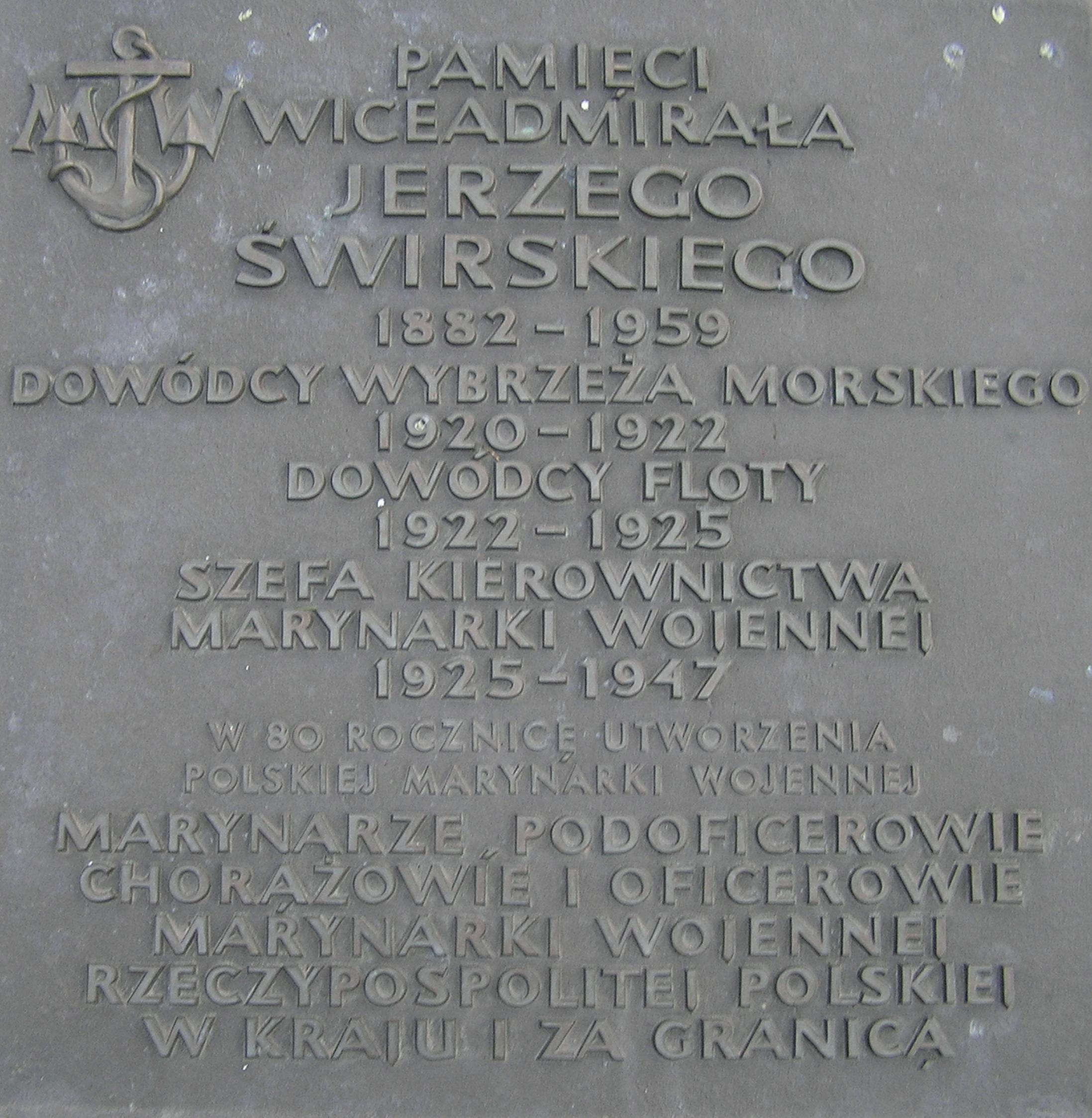
Commemorative plaque for Jerzy Świrski at the Polish Navy Cemetery in Gdynia

== Promotions ==
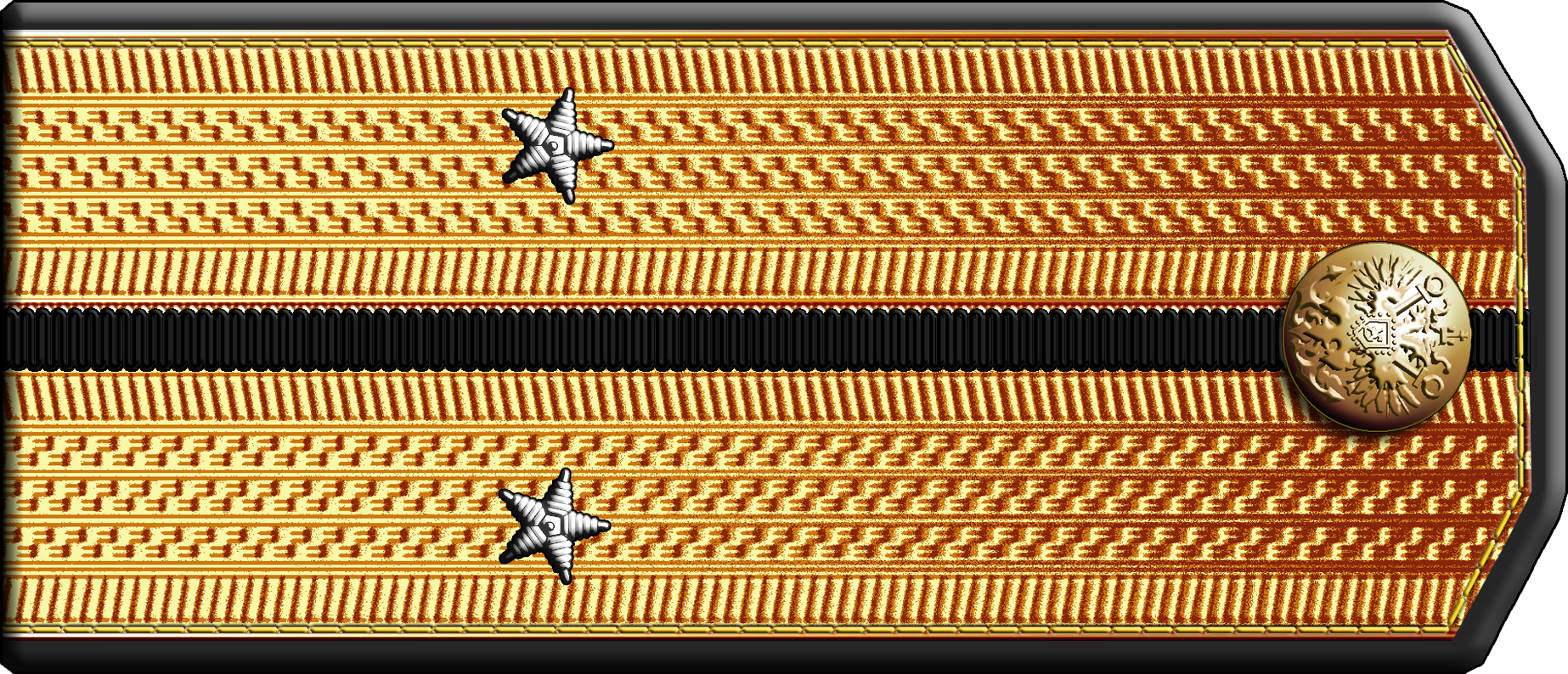
- Michman (Midshipman) - 1902
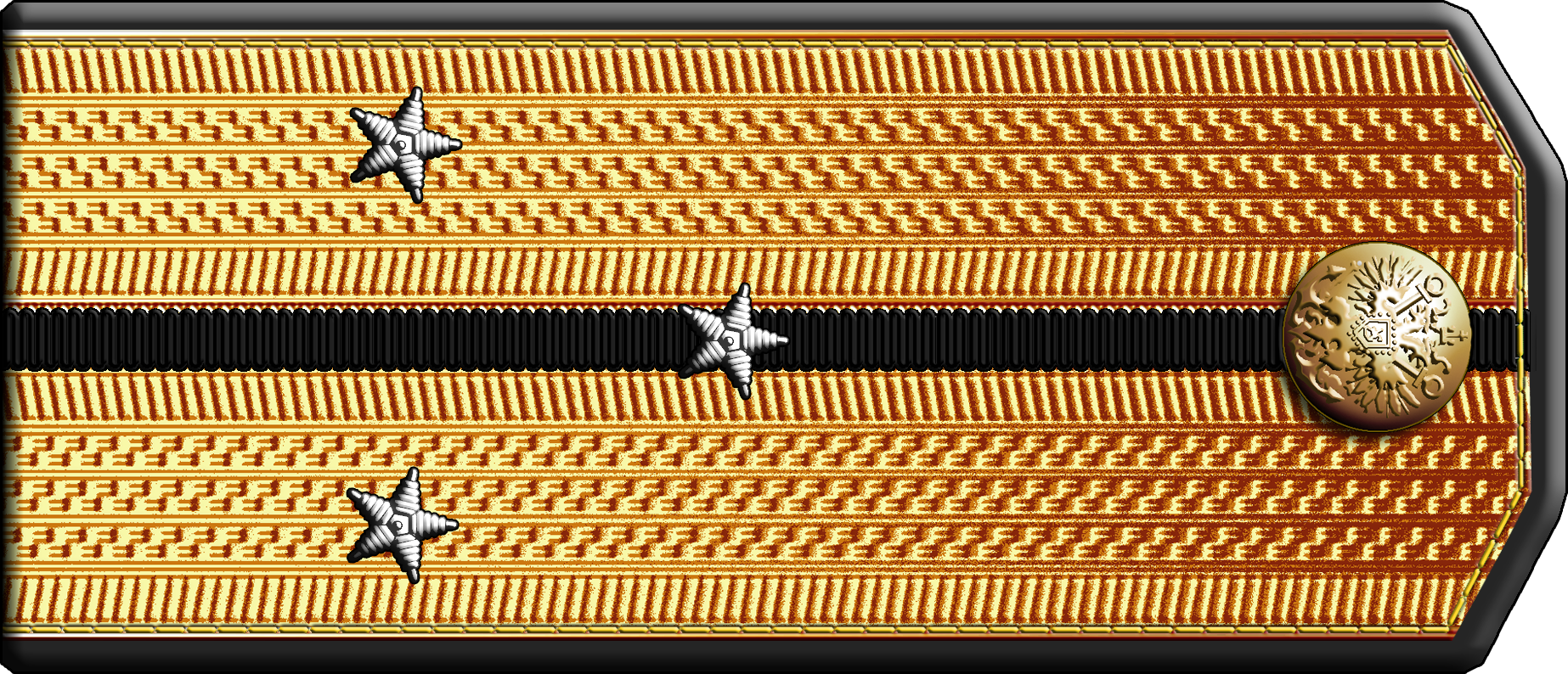
- Leitenant (Lieutenant (junior grade)) - 1905
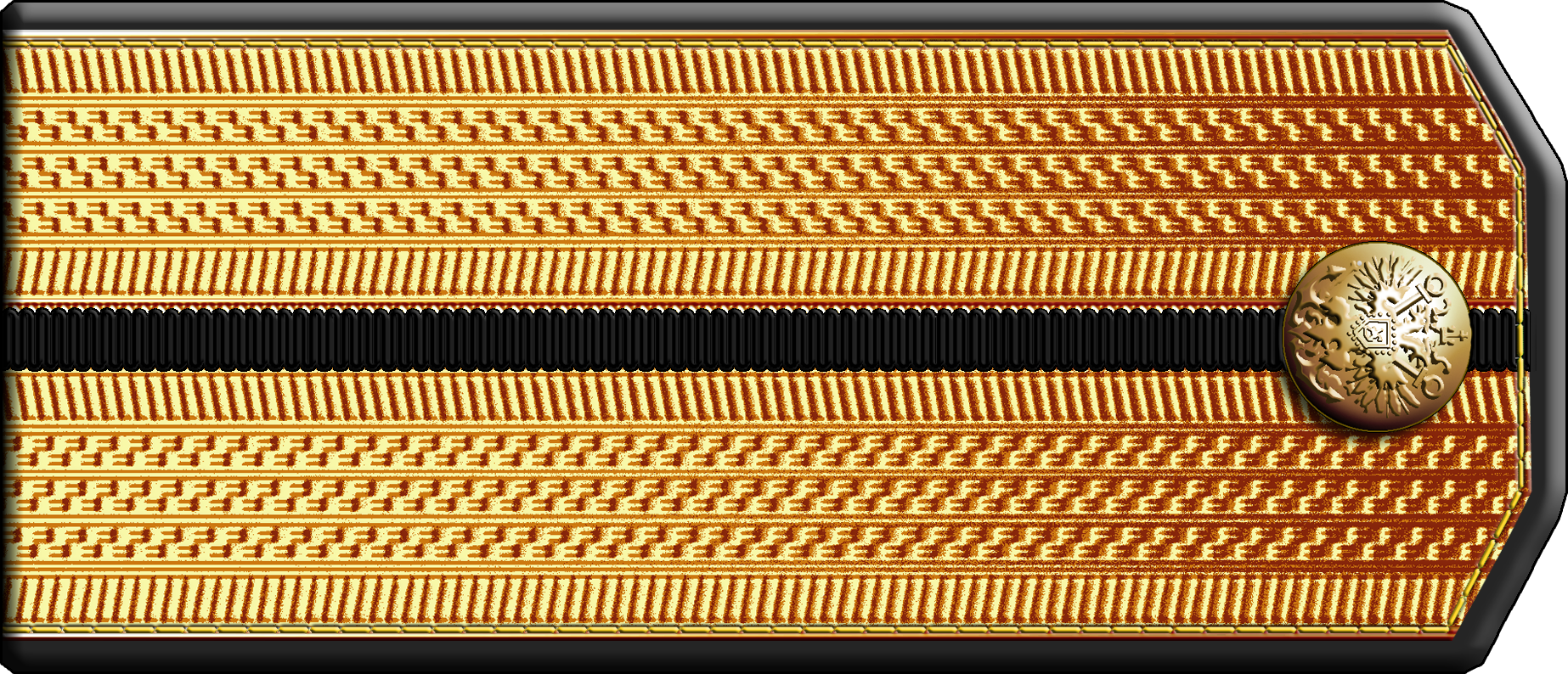
- Starshii leitenant (Lieutenant) - 1912
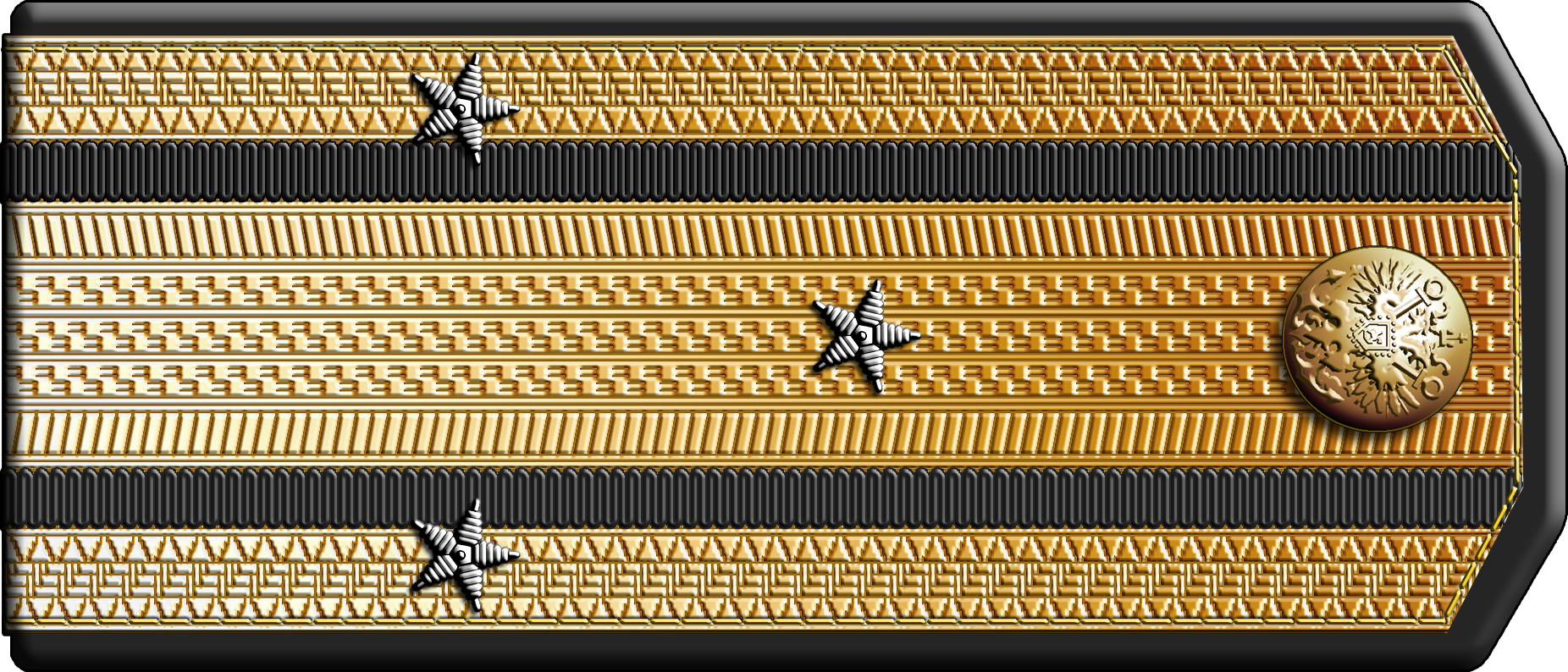
- Kapitan vtorogo ranga (Commander) - 1914
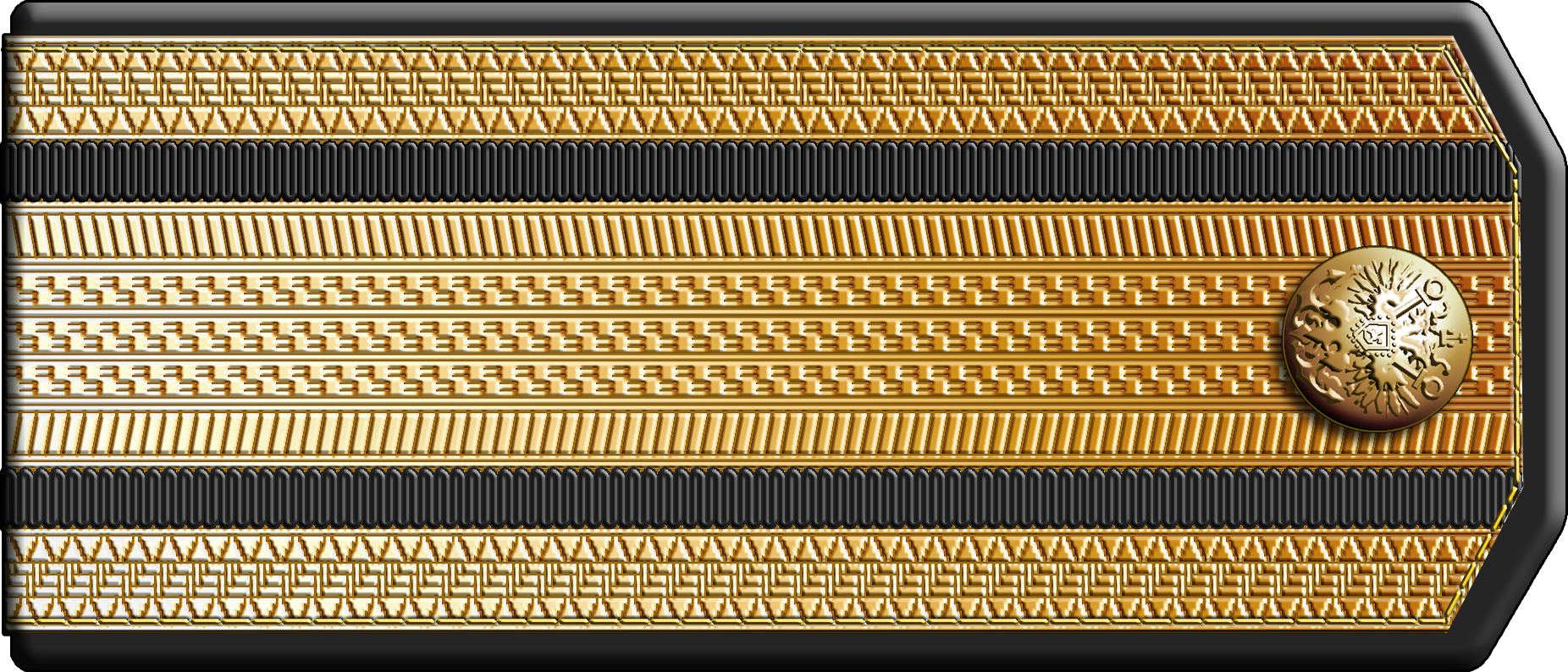
- Kapitan pervogo ranga (Captain) - 1917
- Pułkownik marynarki (Colonel of the navy) - 30 January 1921
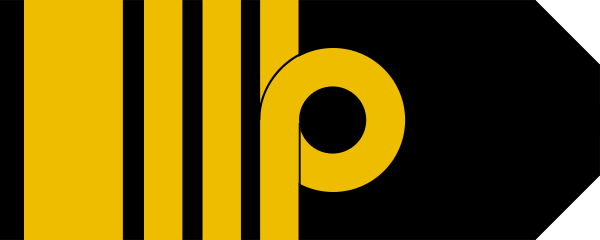
- Komandor (Captain) - 3 May 1922
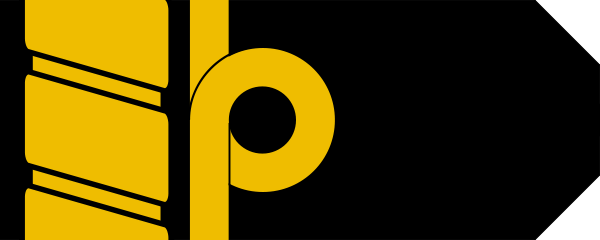
- Kontradmirał (Commodore) - 2 December 1930
- Wiceadmirał (Rear admiral) - 1941

== Honours and awards ==
- Grand Cross of the Order of Polonia Restituta; previously Commander's Cross and Officer's Cross (Poland)
- Gold Cross of Merit (Poland)
- Order of Saint Stanislaus (Poland)
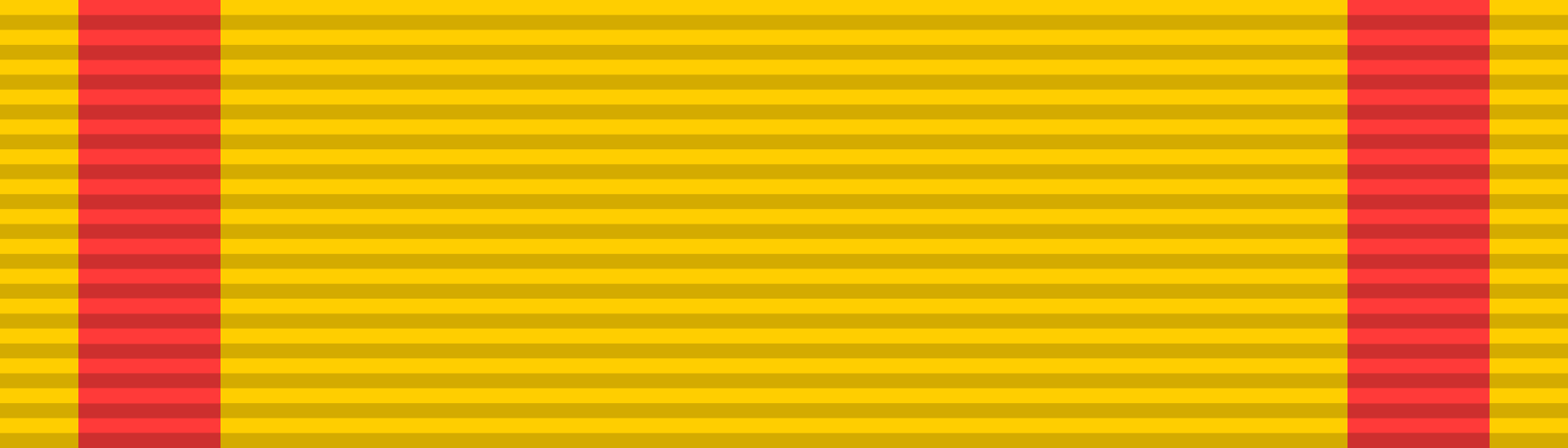
- Order of the Cross of Liberty (Finland)
- Grand Officer of the Legion of Honour; previously Commander and Knight (France)
- Ordre du Mérite Maritime (France)
- Order of St. Vladimir (Russian Empire)
- Order of St. Anna (Russian Empire)
- Order of the Sword (Sweden)
- Honorary Knight Commander of the Order of the Bath (United Kingdom)
- Allied Victory Medal

== See also ==
- Polish Navy
- Jozef Unrug
- MS Batory
- Polish contribution to World War II#Navy
- Polish Merchant Navy
- Polish Navy order of battle in 1939
- Polish Air Forces in France and Great Britain

== Bibliography ==
- Dziennik Personalny Ministerstwa Spraw Wojskowych (Personnel Journal in the Ministry of Military Affairs)
- Roczniki Oficerskie 1923, 1924, 1928 i 1932. (Officers' Annual Reports)
- Graczyk Marcin. Admirał Świrski, Gdańsk: published by Finna Oficyna Wydawnicza 2007 ISBN 978-83-89929-82-2
- Czerwiński, J., Czerwińska, M., Babnis, M., Jankowski, A., Sawicki, J., Kadry Morskie Rzeczypospolitej, vol.II Polska Marynarka Wojenna published by Wyższa Szkoła Morska, Gdynia 1996, ISBN 83-86703-50-4
- Nawrot Dariusz 'Polska Marynarka Wojenna w koncepcjach admirała Jerzego Świrskiego' in Zeszyty Naukowe Akademii Marynarki Wojennej Year LII, No. 2 (185), Gdynia, 2011
- Romanowski Bolesław. Torpeda w celu!: Wspomnienia ze służby na okrętach podwodnych 1939-1945 Warsaw, 1973
- Sokołowska, Małgorzata and Kwiatkowska, Wiesława Gdyńskie cmentarze: O twórcach miasta, portu i floty, Gdynia: Oficyna Verbi-Causa, 2003 ISBN 83-918526-2-8
