= Donald Stoker (historian) =

American military historian

Donald J. Stoker Jr.
- Occupation: historian
- Years active: 1989 - present
- Notable work: The Grand Design: Strategy and the U.S. Civil War

Donald J. Stoker Jr. is a military and diplomatic American military historian with expertise in military theory and grand strategy.

== Education ==
He earned his bachelor's degree in 1989, his Master's of Arts in 1990 from Valdosta State University and his PhD in Military and Diplomatic History from Florida State University, Tallahassee, FL in 1997.

== Career ==
Donald Stoker was a Professor of Strategy and Policy for the U.S. Naval War College’s program at the Naval Postgraduate School in Monterey, California for 18 years. He was a Visiting Fellow and Fulbright Visiting Professor of International Relations, Diplomatic Academy of Vienna, Austria during the 2017-2018 academic year. In 2021, he became Professor of National Security and Resource Strategy at the Dwight D. Eisenhower School of the National Defense University in Washington, DC.

== Publications ==
- Britain, France, and the Naval Arms Trade in the Baltic, 1919-1939: Grand Strategy and Failure. London: Frank Cass, 2003. ISBN 0714653195 OCLC 51607351
- Girding for Battle: The Arms Trade in a Global Perspective, 1815 - 1940. Westport, CT: Praeger, 2003. ISBN 0275973395 OCLC 845526470
- Military Advising and Assistance: From Mercenaries to Privatization, 1815-2007. London: Routledge, 2008. ISBN 9780415770156 OCLC 148729762
- With Harold D. Blanton, and Frederick C. Schneid. Conscription in the Napoleonic Era: A Revolution in Military Affairs? London: Routledge, 2009. ISBN 9780415349994 OCLC 226984653
- The Grand Design: Strategy and the U.S. Civil War. Oxford; New York : Oxford University Press, 2010. ISBN 9780195373059 OCLC 463454485
- With Kenneth J. Hagan, and Michael T. McMaster. Strategy in the American War of Independence: A Global Approach. Abingdon, Oxon: Routledge, 2010. ISBN 9780415367349 OCLC 373060002
- Clausewitz: His Life and Work. New York : Oxford University Press, 2014. ISBN 9780199357949 OCLC 876005873
- With Michael T. McMaster. Naval Advising and Assistance: History, Challenges, and Analysis. Helion and Company, 2017. ISBN 978-1911512820
- With Edward Westermann. Air Force Advising and Assistance: Developing Airpower in Client States. Helion and Company, 2018. ISBN 1912390604
- With Edward Westerman. Expeditionary Police Advising and Militarization: Building Security in a Fractured World. Helion and Company, 2018. ISBN 978-1911512868
- Why America Loses Wars: Limited War and American Strategy Since Korea. Cambridge University Press, 2019. Second edition, paperback, 2021. ISBN 978-1009220866
- With John Dunn. A Naval History of the Middle East: 500-2020. Helion and Company, 2024. ISBN 978-1804512340
- Purpose and Power: US Grand Strategy from the Revolutionary Era to the Present. Cambridge University Press, 2024. ISBN 978-1009257275

== Awards ==
The Grand Design was recognized with Fletcher Pratt award for best non-fiction Civil War book of 2010 by the Civil War Round Table of New York and was a Main Selection of the History Book Club.

He was named as an Outstanding Alumnus of Valdosta State University by the Department of History in 2014.
