= Battle of Gdynia =

Battle in Poland 1939

Coordinates: 54°30′00″N 18°33′00″E

- Part of Invasion of Poland
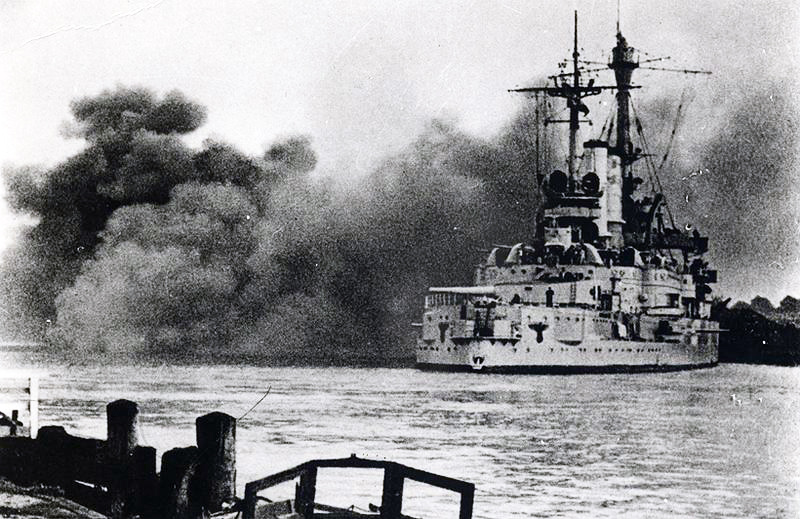
- German battleship Schleswig-Holstein, stationed at Danzig harbour, shelling nearby Polish positions at Gdynia.
Date	1–14 September 1939
Location	Gdynia, Pomeranian Voivodeship, Poland
Result	German victory

Belligerents
Germany	Poland

Commanders and leaders
(Nazi Germany) Fedor von Bock (Nazi Germany) Leonhard Kaupisch	(Second Polish Republic) Józef Unrug (Second Polish Republic) Stanisław Dąbek

Strength
39,000	14,700

Casualties and losses
c. 3,000 dead	c. 5,000 killed, missing or wounded

Battle of Gdynia was one of the major battles in northern Poland during the Invasion of Poland of 1939. The Germans' main push towards Gdynia began on 1 September and they captured Gdynia two weeks later on 14 September. After the fall of Gdynia, the warfare continued on the plateau called Kępa Oksywska.

== Before the battle ==
Gdynia is a major civilian and military port on the Baltic Sea, and was an important industrial centre of the Second Polish Republic. Its defence was one of the key elements in the Polish defence plan. One of the Polish armies, Armia Pomorze, had orders to prevent German forces from breaking through the Polish Corridor that linked most of Germany with East Prussia and to defend Gdynia, Hel, Kępa Oksywska and Oksywie.

The forces defending Gdynia were grouped under the Land Coastal Defence (Lądowa Obrona Wybrzeża), commanded by Colonel Stanisław Dąbek and Naval Coastal Defence (Morska Obrona Wybrzeża) Captain Stanisław Frankowski. The Polish plan foresaw that the Germans would manage to cut off Gdynia from the main forces of Armia Pomorze; therefore, the Land Coastal Defence was tasked with defence of the coast for 8–10 days and promised reinforcements after that period. It was thus prepared for individual operations and reassigned from Armia Pomorze to the Polish Navy, and Stanisław Dąbek received orders directly from counter-admiral Józef Unrug. The Polish Navy would support the coastal defence with 1 destroyer (ORP Wicher); 3 other destroyers had been evacuated from the Baltic Sea during Plan Peking), 1 heavy minelayer (ORP Gryf) and several submarines and smaller surface ships.

On 1 September the Polish Land Coastal Defence force had a strength of approximately 14,700 (increased from about 5,000 two months earlier), with improvised armoured train, 40 artillery pieces (including 8 anti-aircraft), 34 mortars and grenade launchers and approximately 400 machine guns. Infantry units were placed:

- west and Wejherowo:
- south of Gdynia, at Redłowo
- at Kartuzy
- at Koleczkowo
- at Gdynia and Kępa Oksywska

The German forces tasked with the capture of Gdynia were commanded by General Leonhard Kaupisch and formed part of the Army Group North under General Fedor von Bock. They were approximately 39,000 strong, with over 300 artillery pieces, 70 mortars and grenade launchers and 700 machine guns. The Kriegsmarine (German navy) in the area consisted of 2 old battleships, 3 cruisers, 10 destroyers and several smaller units. Approximately 120 Luftwaffe (aircraft) planes were supporting the German forces.

== Battle ==
The German offensive isolated the Polish coast from the Polish mainland between 4 and 8 September, and Armia Pomorze was forced to retreat south-east. Units of Land Coastal Defence has been engaged by the German forces from 1 September, although it was not until the second week of the war that the Germans would begin a direct assault on the Polish port of Gdynia.

The Kriegsmarine, operating in the area with the pre-dreadnought Schleswig-Holstein and smaller units shelled Polish positions, but with limited effect, and were prevented from closing on the coast by Polish coastal batteries (mainly Heliodor Laskowski's battery).

On September 1, the 1st Landespolizei Regiment launched an attack in the direction of Gdynia. The attack coming from the Sopot area was repelled by the Polish 2nd Naval Rifle Regiment. The following day (September 2), numerous skirmishes were fought in this direction to stabilize the situation on the border between Gdynia and Sopot until September 11.

The German land offensive was much more successful. German forces established a connection between Germany and Prussia by 4 September. After heavy fighting near Kartuzy (5 September), their main attack towards Gdynia began on 8 September, and after intense fighting near Puck and Wejherowo (8 September) step by step the Poles were forced back towards the sea.

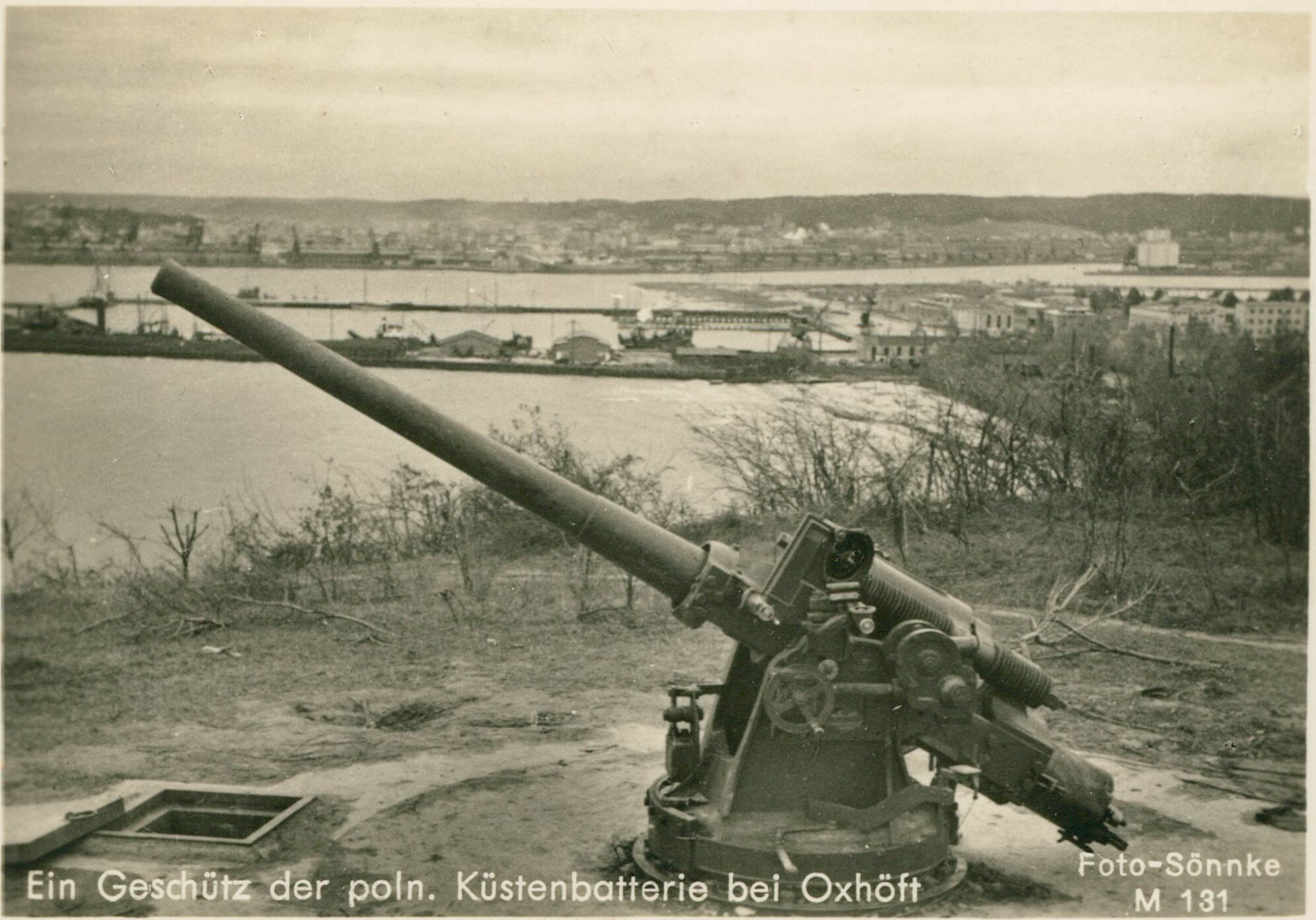
Polish 100 mm battery from Coastal Artillery Division, Gdynia 1939

When the Polish positions outside Gdynia were overrun, and in view of the retreat of the Armia Pomorze, on 10 September Colonel Dąbek decided to abandon Gdynia in order to avoid civilian casualties during the city fighting, and thus on 12 September he ordered all Polish units to retreat from Gdynia toward Kępa Oksywska, a fragment of the coast near Puck Bay. On 11 and 12 September the fights near Mechlinki transformed into an incessant two-day battle, after which Polish troops had to retreat again.

The Germans captured Gdynia on 14 September. Kępa Oksywska was not prepared for siege or provisioned for the approximately 9,000 strong remaining Polish forces and in the battle of Kępa Oksywska the Poles sustained heavy losses (approximately 2,000). After a last failed counterattack on 19 September, Colonel Dąbek, who participated in the front line battle and was wounded, decided to issue order to surrender and committed suicide after giving the order to cease fire.

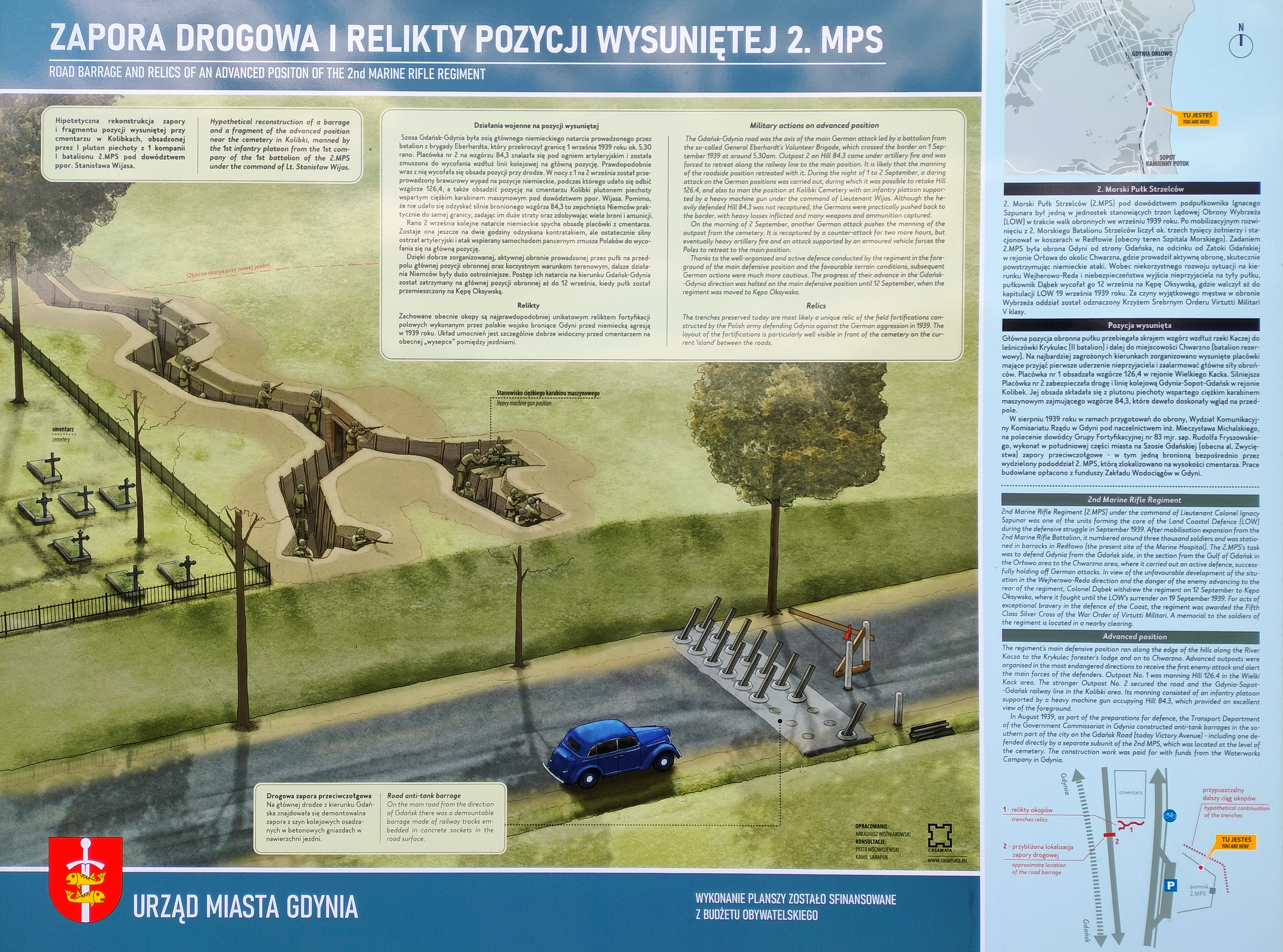
Reconstruction of the anti-tank barrier and field fortifications constructed by the Polish Army in 1939 on the border between the cities of Gdynia and Sopot.

The Polish Navy was tasked to provide support to Gdynia through Plan Worek (submarine operations) and Operation Rurka (laying a mine barrage in Gdańsk Bay). The five submarines assigned to Plan Worek left their war stations in early September. Three submarines faced internment in neutral ports. Two reached Great Britain. One mine set by a submarine sank a German minesweeper. As for Operation Rurka, a German air attack on September 1 left the minelaying vessel damaged, unused mines were dumped into the sea, and the vessel docked in the port in Hel where no mines were readily available, which led to cancellation of the operation.

== Aftermath ==
The 14-day battles for the outskirts of Gdynia were difficult for both sides. The Polish side used and exhausted all means to defend the region cut off from the rest of the country, paying for it with serious losses amounting to about 5,000 killed, wounded and missing. German losses are estimated at nearly 3,000 dead. The remaining units of the Polish army, together with the dismounted sailors from Polish Navy, resisted until September 19 at Kępa Oksywska.

== Quote ==
- Polish soldiers fought gallantly, and they did not spare blood. The area of Gdynia and Danzig was defended by the elite of the Polish armed forces. Those were young and inspired units of the navy and army, which fought admirably. On the plateau of Oxhöft we found trenches filled with dead Polish soldiers, who fell by hundreds where they fought, with the rifles still in their hands. It was apparent, that they fought to the bitter end. from F. O. Busch, Unsere Kriegsmarine im Polnischen Feldzug

== See also ==
- Smok Kaszubski
- Coastal Artillery Division
- List of World War II military equipment of Poland
- List of German military equipment of World War II
