= Grom-class destroyer (1939) =

Planned World War II Polish destroyer class

Class overview
- Builders: Stocznia Marynarki Wojennej, Gdynia
- Operators: Polish Navy
- Preceded by: Original Grom-class destroyer
- Built: 1939
- Planned: Huragan and Orkan

General characteristics
- Class & type: Improved Grom-class destroyer
- Displacement: 2,045 tons standard; 2,214 tons normal; 2,470 tons full
- Length: 114 m (374 ft)
- Beam: 11 m (36 ft 1 in)
- Draft: 3.46 m (11 ft 4 in)
- Installed power: 56,500 shp (42,100 kW)
- Propulsion: Two Parsons steam turbines; 3 boilers; 2 shafts
- Speed: 39 knots (72 km/h; 45 mph)
- Range: 3,500 nmi (6,500 km) at 15 kn (28 km/h)
- Complement: 192
- Armament: 7 × 120 mm (4.7 in) Bofors wz. 34/36 guns; 2 × double 40 mm (1.6 in) AA Bofors guns; 4 × double 13,2 mm AA Hotchkiss HMG; 6 × 550 mm (22 in)/533 mm (21.0 in) torpedo tubes; 2 × depth charge launchers, 20 wz. BH 200 bombs; 44 naval mines

The improved Grom-class destroyers of 1939 were the third and fourth planned ships of the Grom class of destroyers ordered for the Polish Navy shortly before World War II. They were to be built in Poland, the first destroyers so constructed, and were to be named Huragan ("hurricane") and Orkan ("windstorm"), respectively. Their design included greater power and displacement than the first two ships of the class. Their construction was interrupted by the beginning of World War II and they were never completed.

== History ==
In the late 1930s, the Polish Navy decided to expand its destroyer fleet. With positive reviews of the operational service of the two British-built Grom-class destroyers, Grom and Błyskawica, the Navy decided to order two more ships of that type. This time, however, the order was given (on 1 May 1939) to the recently expanded Polish Naval Yard (Stocznia Marynarki Wojennej) in Gdynia rather than to the British J. Samuel White shipyard in Cowes, responsible for the two previous ships. They would have been the first destroyer-class warships to be built in Poland (till then, the Polish shipyards have been building smaller ships, such as minelayers and minesweepers). The White shipyards were to provide the turbines, and some armament was also ordered abroad (main and secondary guns from Swedish Bofors, and machine guns from the French company Hotchkiss et Cie). The cost of the destroyers was 32 million zlotys, of which 55% was to be spent in Poland.

The two new destroyers were planned with several changes in the design. The superstructure and funnels were to be grouped together, and crew quarters layout was changed. Welding was to be used more prominently in the construction. Engine power was to be increased by 2,500 horsepower; the displacement would be increased by 70 tons.

Huragan was to be ready for April 1942 (36 months after being ordered), and Orkan, for October of that year. Construction work on Huragan begun on 15 July 1939, when its keel was laid down. The German invasion of Poland on 1 September 1939 interrupted the construction; some materials were diverted to the improvised armoured train "Kashubian Dragon". Within the next few weeks, the Gdynia and Polish Navy shipyards were captured by the Germans. The construction of the two destroyers, barely started, was never resumed, as the materials were scrapped or re-purposed by the occupier.
