= Smok Kaszubski =

- Type: Armoured train
- Place of origin: Poland

Service history
- In service: 1939
- Used by: Polish Navy
- Wars: World War II

Production history
- Designed: 1939
- Produced: 1–8 September 1939

Specifications
- Armor: 9mm high-tensile steel all-around the engine and cars' sides 6mm steel cars' roofs
- Main armament: 1 × Vickers 40mm AA gun, taken from ORP Mazur; 1 × 47 mm Hotchkiss gun, formerly a saluting gun on ORP Bałtyk
- Secondary armament: 11 × 7.92 mm machine guns

Smok Kaszubski ("Kashubian Dragon") was an improvised Polish armoured train, which served in the Polish defenses during the German invasion in 1939. The train was part of the Land Coastal Defence.

== History ==
The first task of the Smok Kaszubski on September 8 was to reconnoiter enemy forces in the vicinity of Wejherowo. While carrying out the task, it engaged in its first fight with German patrols. Then it exchanged fire with a platoon of combat vehicles of the SS "Heimwehr Danzig" division heading towards Reda - it managed to damage one of the enemy machines. It also repelled air attacks.

The next day, the Smok Kaszubski supported the operations of the 1st Naval Rifle Regiment, moving along the railway line connecting Wejherowo with Rumia. On September 9, the train crew fought a fire duel with German artillery - Captain Błeszyński, the train commander, was mortally wounded. For his achievements and attitude, he was awarded the Virtuti Militari order.

Captain Błeszyński's deputy, Navy Lieutenant Florian Hubicki, took command instead of him. The slightly damaged train withdrew towards Reda and Rumia that same day. September 10 and the following day were marked by continuous fighting on the outskirts of Gdynia. "Smok" supported the actions of Polish units fighting in the area and also took part in the evacuation of soldiers from the Reda station.

The combat path of "Smok Kaszubski" ended in the immediate vicinity of the former Rumia-Zagórze station. On September 12, taking advantage of the temporary stabilization of the front, the train crew was allowed to rest. At that time, Lieutenant Hubicki went to the command with a report. The German air force took advantage of this moment. The Ju-87 dive bombers targeted the train. The train was successfully bombed and almost completely destroyed. There were also wounded and fatalities. The surviving locomotive was withdrawn to Gdynia. Reconstruction of the "Smok" began almost immediately, but as a result of the ongoing german offensive it was never used in combat.

== Design ==
The train was built in September 1939, at the initiative of Kapitan marynarki Jerzy Błeszyński, by employees of the workshop of the naval port in Gdynia. For the construction of the steel plates, steel from the hulls of unfinished destroyers Orkan and Huragan was used. The first commander of the train was Kapitan Błeszyński. After his injury on 9 September 1939 in Wejherowo, command of the train was taken over by Porucznik marynarki Florian Hubicki.

The operating personnel of the train was mostly formed by the Gdynian railways workers and sailors from the former company servicing the port.

Composition of the train:
- 1 × tank locomotive OKl27 armoured with steel plates
- 2 × armoured cars for troops
- 2 × battle cars

Armor:
9mm high-tensile steel all-around the engine and cars' sides
6mm steel cars' roofs

Armament:
- 1 × Vickers 40mm AA gun, taken from ORP Mazur
- 1 × 47 mm Hotchkiss gun, formerly a saluting gun on ORP Bałtyk
- 11 × Ciężki karabin maszynowy wz. 30
- 30 × small arms from ORP Wicher

== See also ==
- List of armoured trains
