= Land Coastal Defence =

Land Coastal Defence (or Land Coastal Command, Polish: Lądowa Obrona Wybrzeża, abbr. LOW), commanded by Colonel Stanisław Dąbek (land forces), was an important unit tasked with the defence of Poland's Baltic Sea coast during the 1939 invasion.

== Before the war ==
LOW was at first subordinate to the Toruń-based military area command led by General Władysław Bortnowski (Armia Pomorze), but was later reassigned from Armia Pomorze to the Polish Navy, and received orders directly from Counter-Admiral Józef Unrug. Its first commander was Col. Józef Sass-Hoszowski and, after July 23, 1939, Col. Stanisław Dąbek. It was part of the Coastal Defence Group (Grupa Obrony Wybrzeża), tasked with organizing the defence of the Polish seashore, as well as the borders with Nazi Germany and Danzig, and the preparation of the defence of the Polish naval bases and mobilization centres (Gdynia, Oksywie, Hel, Westerplatte). LOW was to defend Gdynia and Oksywie; Hel and Westerplatte had their own dedicated formations under the Coastal Defence Group. LOW's task was to defend the most important of Polish mobilization centers around Gdynia - the major Polish port - for about 8–10 days, after which it was expected to be relieved by a Polish Army counterattack. As it was clear that the Polish defenders of the so-called Polish Corridor would be at least temporarily cut off from the Polish mainland, the defence was organized into several fortified lines that were to shield the naval base of the Hel Peninsula and the city of Gdynia from all sides.

LOW numbered about 15,000 troops with limited artillery (about 40 40-105mm artillery pieces, plus some anti-aircraft guns).

== Wartime performance ==
After the Germans destroyed most of the Armia Pomorze by 5 September in the Battle of Tuchola Forest, LOW was separated from the majority of Polish forces. Faced with the numerically and technically superior German forces (numbering about twice as many soldiers, and supported by heavy artillery, tanks and aircraft), LOW defended Gdynia from 8 to 15 September, then retreated to Kępa Oksywska, which was defended until 19 September.

Several well-known battles on the Polish coast in September 1939 - such as the Battle of Westerplatte, the Defence of the Polish Post in Danzig and the Battle of Hel - did not involve LOW troops.

LOW sustained about 5,000 casualties (2,000 dead, 3,000 wounded); that is, about 33% of its original strength. 75% of Polish forces in the coastal area were under Land Coastal Defence supervision; 95% of the Polish casualties in that region were LOW troops.

== Organization ==
The units of LOW included:

- Wejherowo Independent Detachment (Odział Wydzielony Wejherowo; west of Wejherowo) under Lt. Col. Kazimierz Pruszkowski
  - 1st Marine Rifles Regiment
  - Puck National Defence Battalion
- Redłowo Independent Detachment (Odział Wydzielony Redłowo; south of Gdynia) under Lt. Col. Ignacy Szpunar
  - 2nd Marine Rifles Regiment
  - 1st Reserve Infantry Battalion
- Kartuzy Independent Detachment (Odział Wydzielony Kartuzy) under Captain Marian Mordawski
  - Gdynia II National Defence Battalion
  - Kartuzy National Defence Battalion
- Gdynia I National Defence Battalion (near Koleczkowo)

The remainder of the Polish forces, including the improvised units, the mobilized Police, Border Guards, Border Defence Corps and some volunteers, were to defend the outskirts of Gdynia and the Oksywie Heights (German Oxhöft). Anti-air defence was provided by the 1st and 2nd battalion of AA artillery, with 14 75 mm guns wz.22/24 and 14 40 mm wz. 38 guns. Altogether, the forces subordinate to Col. Dąbek numbered ca. 15,000.

== Quote ==
- Polish soldiers fought gallantly, and they did not spare blood. The area of Gdynia and Danzig was defended by the elite of the Polish armed forces. Those [sic] were young and inspired units of the navy and army, which fought admirably. On the plateau of Oxhöft we found trenches filled with dead Polish soldiers, who fell by [the] hundreds where they fought, with rifles still in their hands. It was apparent, that they fought to the bitter end. from F. O. Busch, Unsere Kriegsmarine im Polnischen Feldzug

== See also ==
- Coastal Artillery Division (Poland)
