= Peking Plan =

Evacuation of Polish navy ships (1939)

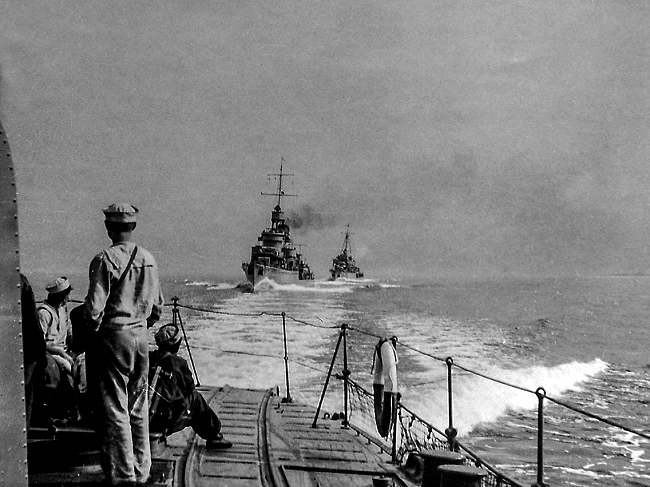
Polish destroyers during the Peking Plan. View from Błyskawica of Grom and Burza.

The Peking Plan (Note: "Peking" was one contemporary spelling for the city now spelled 'Beijing' in English. In modern Polish the name is written as "Pekin". Some modern Polish works refer to the "Pekin Plan". The original orders used the spelling "Peking".) (or Operation Peking) was an operation in which three destroyers of the Polish Navy, the Burza, Błyskawica, and Grom, were evacuated to the United Kingdom in late August and early September 1939. They were ordered to travel to British ports and assist the British Royal Navy in the event of a war with Nazi Germany. The plan was successful and allowed the ships to avoid certain destruction or capture in the German invasion.

== Background ==
The plan was created in order to remove the Destroyer Division (Dywizjon Kontrtorpedowców) of the Polish Navy from the Baltic Sea operation theatre. The Kriegsmarine had a significant numerical advantage over the Polish Navy, and in the event of a war the Polish High Command realised that ships which remained in the Baltic Sea were likely to be quickly sunk by the Germans. Also, the Danish Straits were well within the operational range of the Kriegsmarine and Luftwaffe, so there was little chance for the plan to succeed, if implemented after hostilities began.

On 24 August 1939, the British government, through Lieutenant-General Sir Adrian Carton De Wiart, head of the British Military mission, made strong representations to Marshal Edward Śmigły-Rydz, commander-in-chief of the Polish Forces, that the most modern elements of the fleet be evacuated from the Baltic Sea. Although Śmigły-Rydz resisted the idea at first, he finally agreed.

Part of Śmigły-Rydz's reason for so doing was the idea of a Romanian Bridgehead. It was hoped the Polish forces could hold out in the southeast of the country, near the common border with Romania, until relieved by a Franco-British offensive. The western powers could send munitions and arms via Romanian ports and railways, and the Polish Navy would escort the ships delivering the supplies to Romanian ports.

== Docking at Edinburgh ==
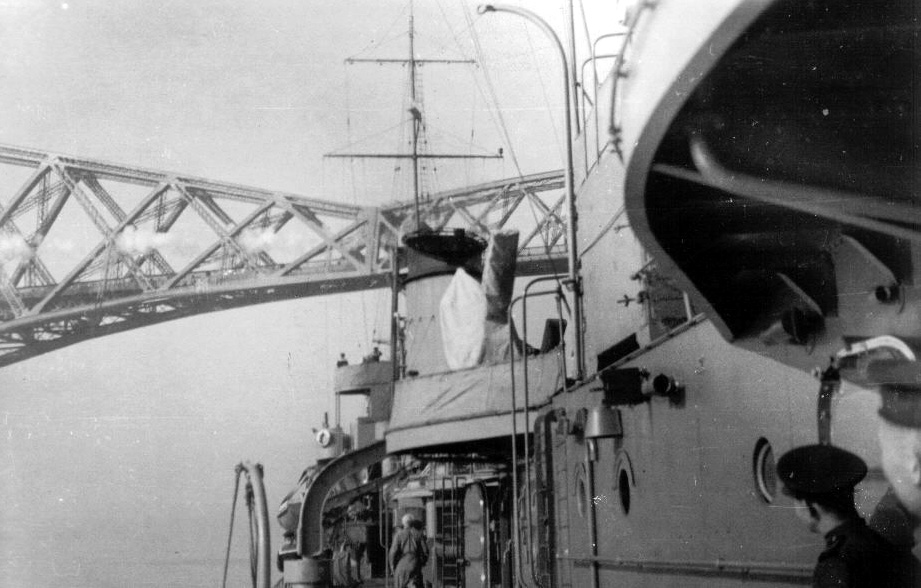
Polish destroyer (Błyskawica or Grom) under the Forth Railway Bridge in Scotland

As tensions between Poland and Germany increased, the Commander of the Polish Fleet, Counter Admiral Józef Unrug signed the order for the operation on 26 August 1939, a day after the signing of the Polish-British Common Defence Pact. The order was delivered in sealed envelopes to the ships' command. On 29 August, the fleet received the signal "Peking, Peking, Peking" from the Polish Commander-in-Chief, Marshal Śmigły-Rydz: "Execute Peking". At 12:55 hours, the ships received the signal via signal flags or radio from the signal tower at Oksywie. The respective commanders of the ships opened the envelopes and departed at 14:15 under the command of Komandor porucznik Roman Stankiewicz. Błyskawica was commanded by Komandor porucznik Włodzimierz Kodrębski, Burza by Komandor podporucznik Stanisław Nahorski and Grom by Komandor porucznik Aleksander Hulewicz.

The ships sailed without any problems through the Baltic, entering Øresund after midnight. In the passage they encountered the German light cruiser Königsberg and a destroyer, but as the war had not yet started there was no combat. The Polish ships then passed through the Kattegat and Skagerrak. On 31 August, the ships were spotted and followed by German reconnaissance seaplanes, and the group changed course towards Norway in order to shake off the pursuit during the night, when they returned to their original course towards the UK. The ships entered the North Sea, and at 0925 on 1 September learned about the German invasion of Poland. At 12:58, they encountered the Royal Navy destroyers HMS Wanderer and Wallace and received a liaison officer. At 17:37, they docked in Leith, the port of Edinburgh.

== Aftermath in Allied Forces ==
The Peking Plan generated controversy in Poland, but it proved to be a wise decision. The ships and their crews served alongside the Royal Navy throughout the war (the ORP Burza and ORP Błyskawica survived the war, whereas the ORP Grom was sunk on 4 May 1940 in the Rombaken fjord, near Narvik, during the Norwegian Campaign). On the other hand, all the other surface ships of the Polish Navy which had remained in the Baltic were engaged and sunk or captured by the German fleet, starting with the Battle of the Gdańsk Bay on 1 September. The two remaining major warships of the Polish fleets, the destroyer Wicher and the heavy minelayer Gryf, were both sunk by 3 September 1939.

As for the Germans, in the face of the Peking Plan on 30 August, they recalled from the Baltic Sea the tactical unit which had been assigned to engage them — the three light cruisers Nürnberg, Köln and Leipzig, under Vice-Admiral Hermann Densch.

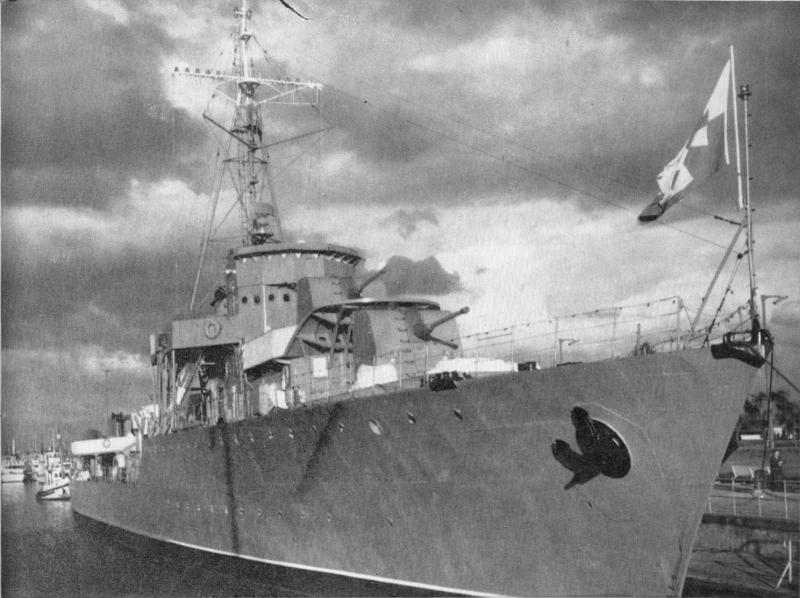
ORP Burza

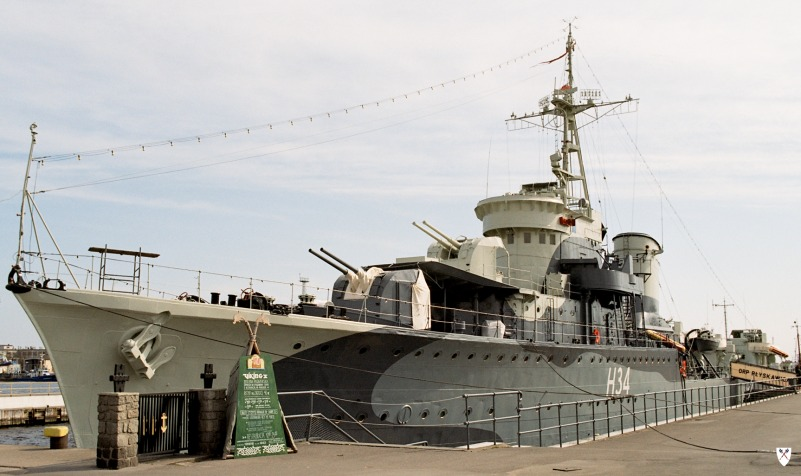
ORP Błyskawica

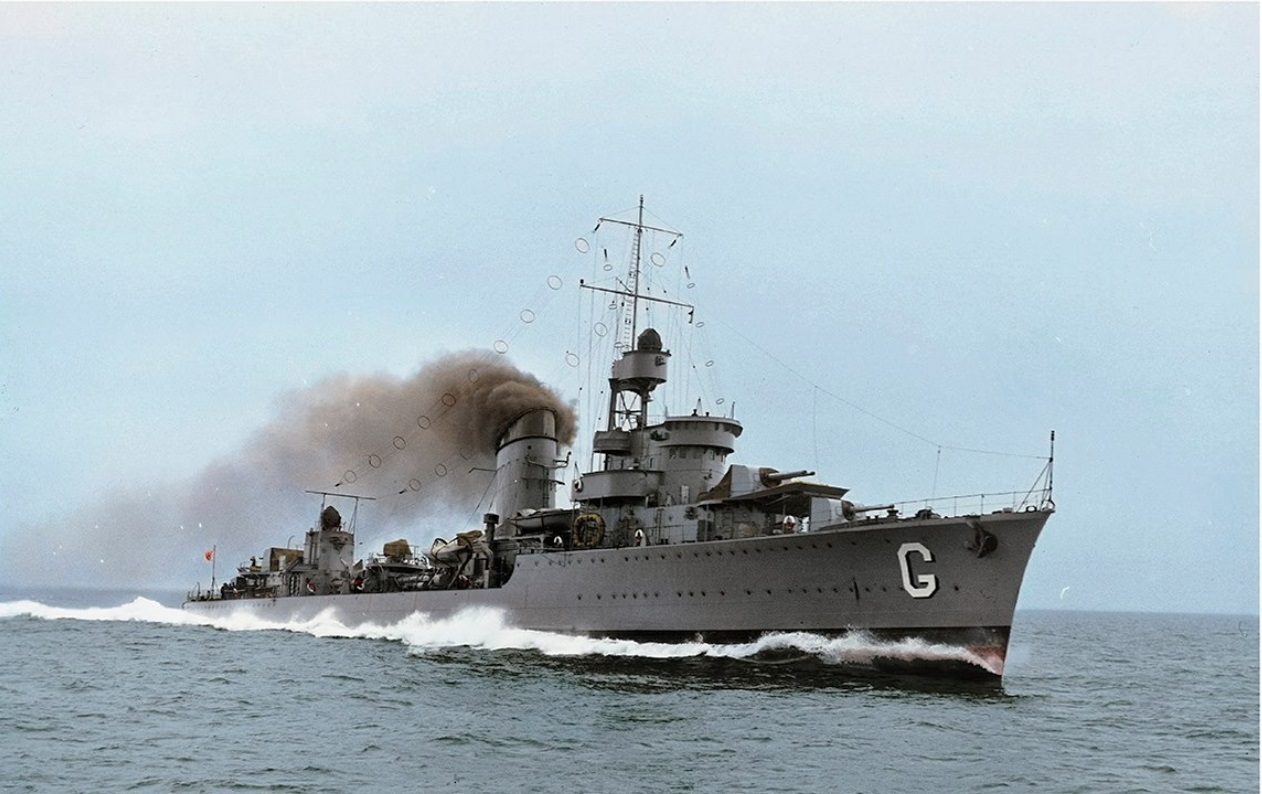
ORP Grom

== See also ==
- Orzeł incident
- Plan Worek
- Polish Navy order of battle in 1939
