= Grom-class destroyer =

World War II Polish destroyer class

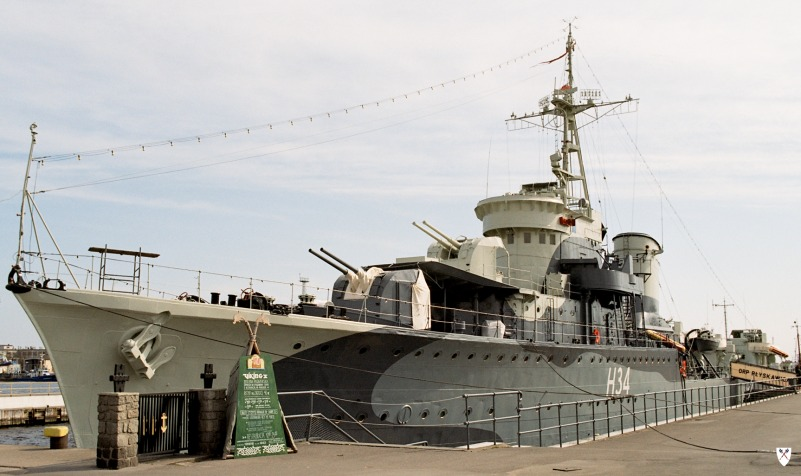
- ORP Błyskawica

Class overview
- Builders: J. Samuel White, Cowes
- Operators: Polish Navy
- Preceded by: Wicher class
- Succeeded by: Improved Grom class (planned); Skory class (actual)
- Completed: 2
- Lost: 1
- Retired: 1
- Preserved: 1

General characteristics
- Type: Destroyer
- Displacement: 2,144 tons standard; 2,560 tons full load
- Length: 114 m
- Beam: 11.3 m
- Draught: 3.3 m
- Propulsion: Pearson geared turbine engines; 54,000 shp
- Speed: 39 knots (72 km/h; 45 mph)
- Complement: 192
- Armament: Initial: 7 x 4.7 in (120 mm) (3 × 2, 1 × 1); 4 x 40 mm AA (2 × 2); 8 x 13.2 mm MG (4 × 2); 6 x 21 in (533 mm) torpedo tubes (2 × 3); Depth charge throwers

The Grom-class destroyers were two destroyers, built for the Polish Navy by the British company of J. Samuel White, Cowes. They were laid down in 1935 and commissioned in 1937. The two Groms were some of the fastest and most heavily armed destroyers of World War II.

== Design ==
Despite having ordered its previous pair of destroyers (ORP Burza and ORP Wicher) from France, a country with which it had strong ties, Poland decided to acquire the second pair from the Britain, possibly in recognition of the excellence of British destroyer designs. The selected design resulted in large and powerful ships, superior to German and Soviet destroyers and comparable to the famous British Tribal class of 1936. The main armament was changed from the 130 mm (5.1 in) used on the Wicher-class destroyer to the standard British destroyer calibre of 4.7 in (120 mm). The guns were not British, but were instead Swedish Bofors 50cal QF M34/36, the same as those used on the minelayer ORP Gryf.

=== Original Grom class ===
There were two ships built, ORP Grom, sunk on 4 May 1940 in Ofotfjord near Narvik and ORP Blyskawica that survived the war and is preserved as a museum ship in Gdynia.

=== Improved Grom class ===
Two more ships of this class (Huragan and Orkan) were ordered in 1939 to be built in Gdynia but war broke out soon after the first was laid down; they would have been the first modern warships to be built in Poland.

== Operational service ==
Just before the war broke out, the two destroyers were evacuated to Britain to fight alongside the Royal Navy. Since they were designed for Baltic operations, they had to be modified to improve stability to operate in the rough waters of the North Sea and the Atlantic. Grom was sunk in 1940 and in December 1941 Błyskawica, had its 4.7 in (120 mm) guns replaced by eight 4 in (100 mm) guns in twin mountings. Various other modifications of armaments and sensors were made during the war.

== Bibliography ==
- Whitley, M. J. (2000). Destroyers of World War Two: An International Encyclopedia. London: Cassell & Co. ISBN 1-85409-521-8.
