= Stanisław Dąbek =

Polish infantry colonel

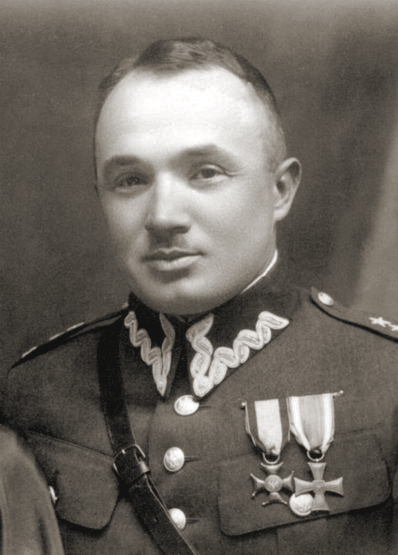
- Born: March 28, 1892; Nisko, Kingdom of Galicia and Lodomeria, Austria-Hungary
- Died: September 19, 1939 (aged 47); Kępa Oksywska, Pomeranian Voivodeship, Poland
- Military career
- Allegiance: Austria-Hungary; Poland
- Branch: Austro-Hungarian Army; Polish Armed Forces
- Service years: 1914 – 1939
- Rank: Brigadier General (posthumously, 1964)
- Commands: 14th Kujavian Infantry Regiment; 7th Legions' Infantry Regiment; 52nd Land Infantry Regiment; Land Coastal Defence
- Conflicts: World War I; Eastern Front (WIA); Italian Front; Polish–Ukrainian War; Polish–Soviet War; World War II; Battle of Gdynia; Battle of Kępa Oksywska †

Stanisław Dąbek (March 28, 1892 – September 19, 1939) was a Polish infantry colonel in the Polish Armed Forces, he was commander of the Marine Brigade of National Defense and acting commander of the Land Defense of the Coast during the Invasion of Poland; posthumously promoted to the rank of brigadier general.

== Biography ==
Dąbek was born in a peasant family, one of six children in the family of Szczepan Dąbek and Rozalia née Powęska. In 1900, Stanisław's father purchased a farm in Felsendorf. In March 1939, the name of the town was changed to Dąbków. Young Dąbek began his education in Nisko where in the years 1901 to 1905 he attended a 4-grade elementary school. In the following years, he graduated from the 5th and 6th grade of the faculty school in Lubaczów. The next stage of education was studying at the teachers' college in Sokal, which he graduated in 1913 with the secondary school leaving examination. After graduating from the seminary, he worked as a teacher in the Bibrka poviat , in the Lwów Voivodeship.

In connection with the outbreak of World War I in 1914, he was called up to serve in the infantry of the Austro-Hungarian Army as a one-year volunteer, and then sent to the school for reserve officers in Belzinek near Pilsk in Moravia. After graduating from the School of Reserve Officers, he was awarded the rank of second lieutenant and was sent to the Eastern Front. He was seriously wounded during the fighting in the Carpathians. After rehabilitation, he fought in Italy until the end of the war.

At the end of 1918 he joined the Polish Armed Forces. He took part in the war with the Ukrainians and the Bolsheviks, and for his bravery demonstrated during the fights, he was twice awarded the Cross of Valour. On September 15, 1920, his April 1920 appointment was approved as infantry major in the group of officers of the former Austro-Hungarian army.

He was successively commander of the 2nd battalion of the 14th Kujavian Infantry Regiment and in the 8th and 7th infantry regiments of the Legions. On May 3, 1922, he was verified as a major.

On December 1, 1924, he was promoted to lieutenant colonel. On May 1, 1925, he was commissioned for three months from the 8th to the 7th Infantry Regiment of the Legions, in order to "temporarily perform the duties of the regiment commander in lieu". On March 11, 1926, he was transferred from the position of the commander of the 1st battalion to the position of the deputy commander of the 7th Infantry Regiment in Chełm. From February 3, 1928, he was a student of the 3rd unification three-month course for regimental commanders at the Experimental Training Center in Rembertów. In 1928 he was appointed the commander of the Infantry Reserve Officer Cadet School No. 4 in Tomaszów Mazowiecki. From 1929 to 1930 he was the commander of the Infantry Reserve Officer Cadet School in Zambrów. On July 15, 1930, he was appointed the commander of the 7th Infantry Regiment of the Legions in Chełm. On December 10, 1931, he was promoted to colonel with the seniority of January 1, 1932, and 9th place in the corps of infantry officers. As a regiment commander he got into a dispute with the inspector of the army, General Dąb-Biernacki, opposing the favoring of soldiers with a legionary past. As a result, in 1937 he was transferred and took command of the 52nd Land Infantry Regiment of Borderlands Riflemen in Złoczów.

On the eve of World War II, on July 23, 1939, he was appointed commander of the Marine Brigade of National Defense and acting commander of the Land Coastal Defence. As a person of great diligence and great organizational inventiveness, he undertook active work on strengthening the defensive positions and strengthening the armaments of units subordinate to him. As a result of his activities, the number of Polish branches in the Gdynia region increased from 5,000 to up to 15-18 thousand people. The tasks set for LOW envisaged maintaining the foreground of Gdynia for 3 days, and then a 7-day defense of Kępa Oksywska as the last defense bastion. During the September campaign, Colonel Dąbek actively commanded all the land forces gathered around Gdynia by organizing offensive forays. On the night of September 1/2 and 3/4, he attacked the enemy in the Gdynia-Kolibki-Osowo area, removing his pressure from the south, and on September 6/7 and 7/8 he ordered an attack on the Nowy Dwór Wejherowski - Wejherowo axis. The counterattack of 3 battalions on the Zagórze - Reda axis was planned for September 12, aimed at pushing back the enemy forces to the north and separating their forces, but it ended in a fiasco due to errors in the implementation of the assigned tasks. In view of the overwhelming forces of the Wehrmacht and the cut-off of the Polish troops on the coast from the rest of the country, Dąbek decided to evacuate the forces remaining in his hands (9-10 thousand people) to Kępa Oksywska. In the evening of September 19, 1939, in the area of Babich Dołów, in the face of inevitable defeat, he took his own life with a shot in the head, ordering the immediate cessation of the fight after his death. A modest funeral ceremony, after which the colonel was buried in a grave near the Quarantine Institution, was conducted by Fr. Cdr. Władysław Miegoń, the first chaplain of the Navy. On October 23, 1946, exhumations took place at the "Babi Dół cemetery", incl. col. Dąbka. On the other hand, on October 30, 1946, the solemn funeral of the commander of the Land Defense of the Coast and his six comrades-in-arms took place. On August 30, 1957, on the grave of Colonel Dąbek at the Cemetery of the Defenders of the Coast in Redłowo, a tombstone was unveiled with the words "I will show you how a Pole fights and dies". A memorial plaque was unveiled in Babie Doły on September 19, 1974, to commemorate the place of the colonel's death. The colonel's wife, Irena Dąbek, participated in the ceremony. The plaque was made by the Naval Shipyard Foundry. This place is not accessible to the general public, as it is located in the 43rd Naval Aviation Base.

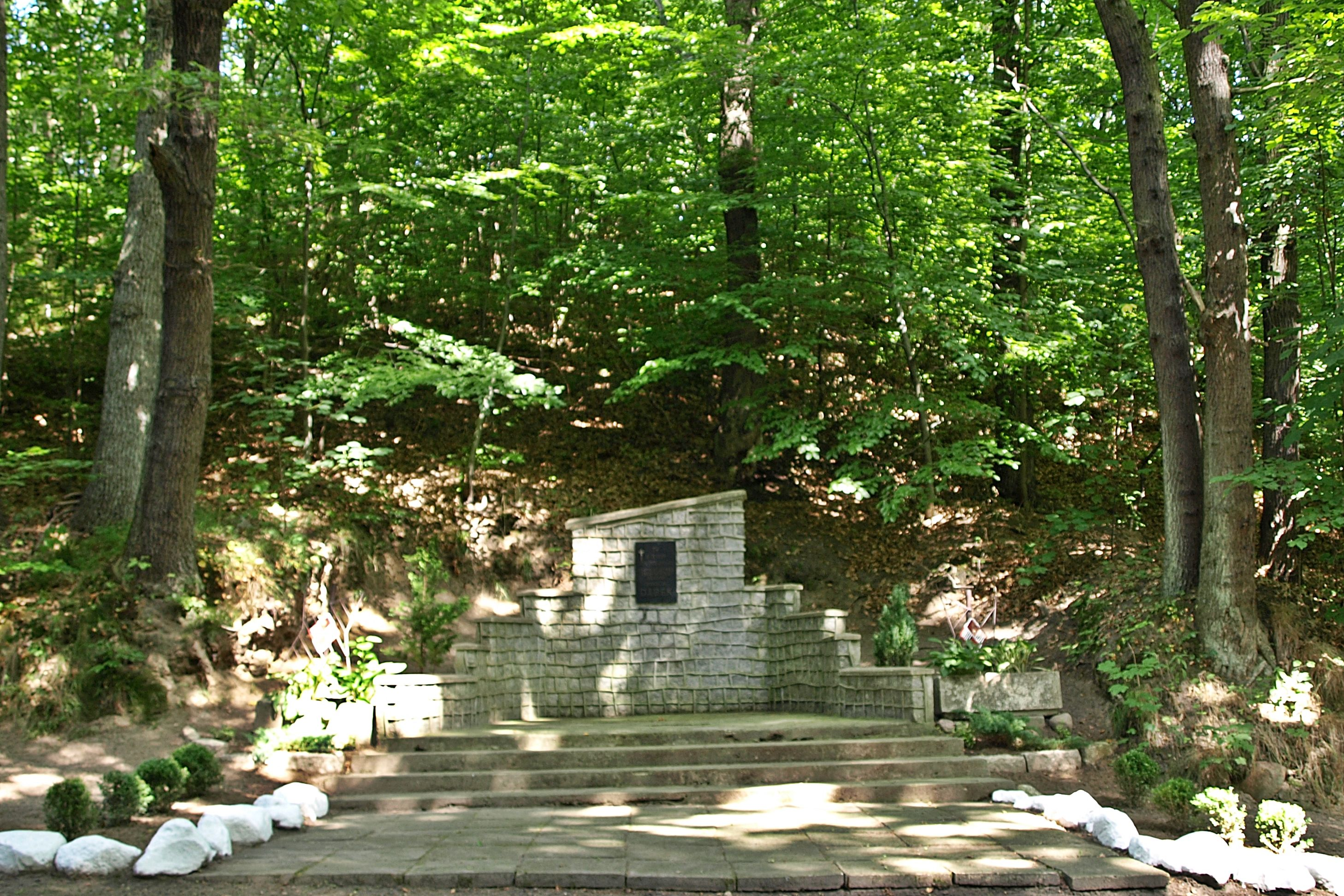
Monument at the site of the war burial of Col. Stanisław Dąbek

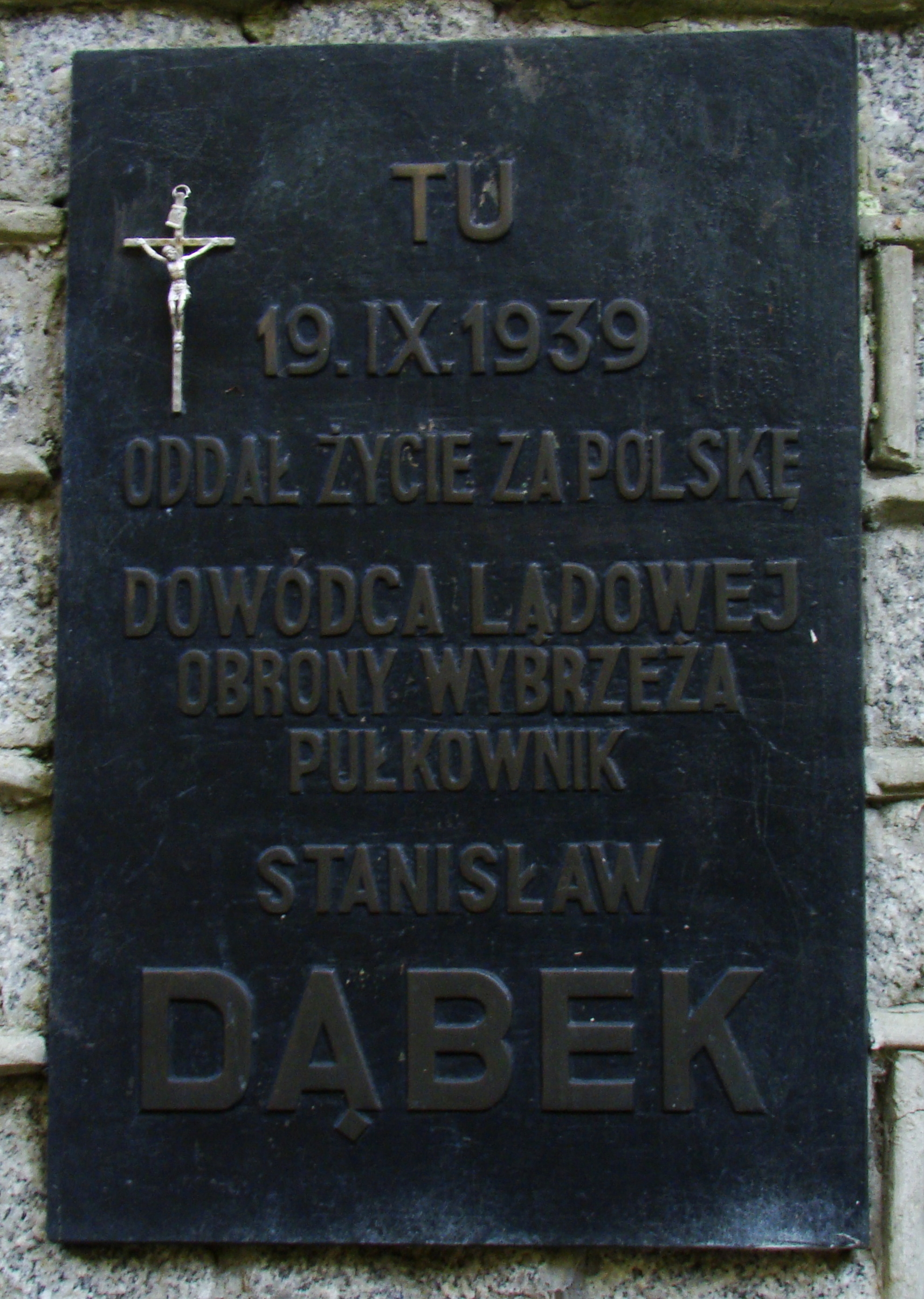
Plaque from the monument to Col. Stanisława Dąbka

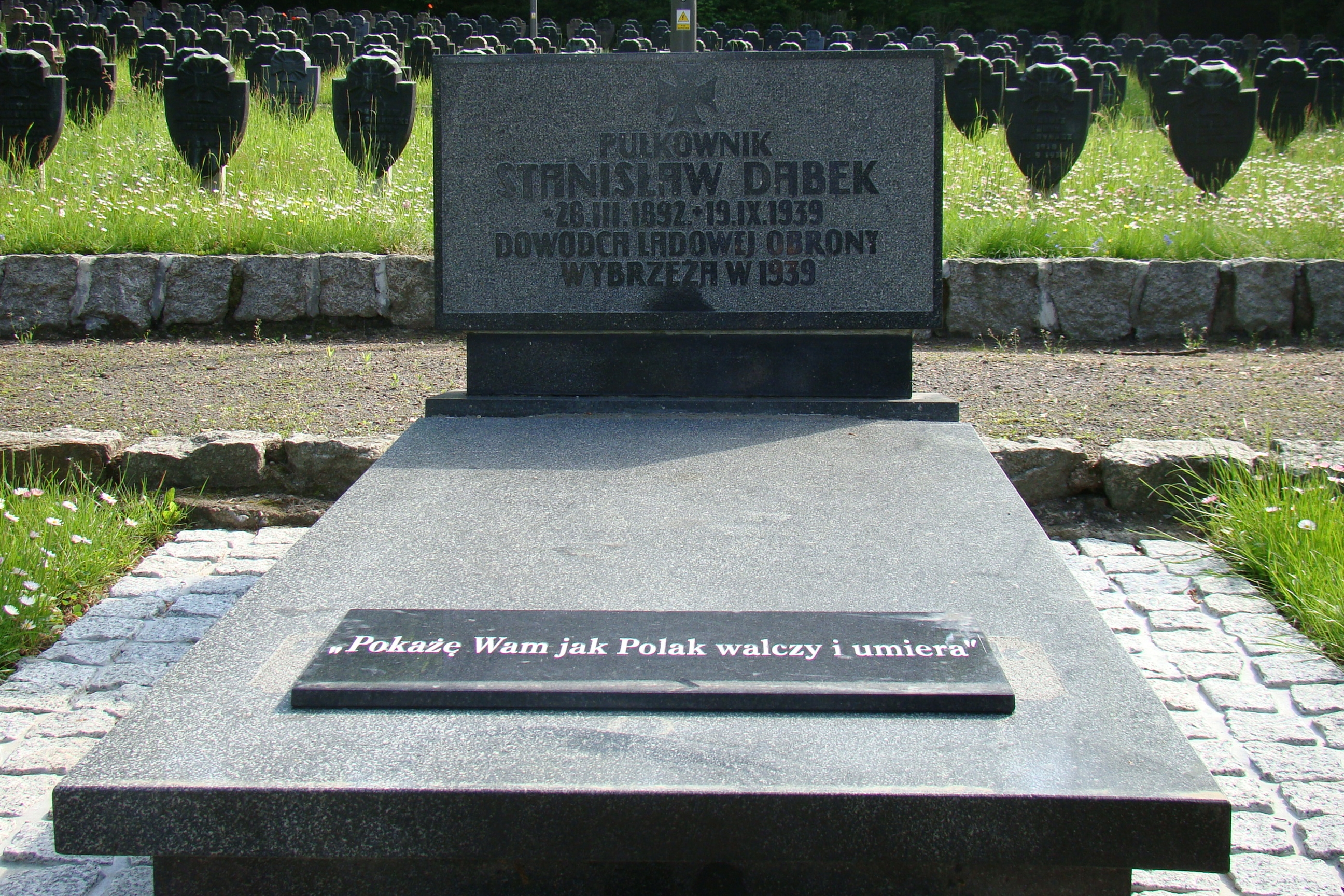
Monument on the grave of Colonel Stanisław Dąbek with a renewed epitaph - Cemetery of the Defenders of the Coast, Gdynia Redłowo

Colonel Stanisław Dąbek was posthumously promoted to the rank of brigadier general, for the first time by the Commander-in-Chief, Gen. Władysław Anders with seniority on January 1, 1964; and for the second time in 1969 by the President of the Republic of Poland in Exile, August Zaleski. The President of the Republic of Poland, Lech Wałęsa, in his Order of June 4, 1993, on the recognition of military ranks granted by the authorities of the Republic of Poland in Exile, recognized the rank of brigadier general, awarded posthumously by the Commander-in-Chief.

== Commemoration ==
Stanisław Dąbek is the patron of:

- 143 of the Gdynia Scout Team "Dąbrowa" (ZHR)
- V Level of General Education in Gdynia
- Primary School in Sychów
- Public Primary School No. 1 in Nisko (in 2015 the patron was changed from Colonel to General Stanisław Dąbek)
- Primary School No. 10 with Integration Departments in Tczew
- Primary School No. 1 in Lubaczów (in 2003 the school changed its patron from colonel to General Stanisław Dąbek)
- Command of the Naval Port in Gdynia
- Vocational Education Center in Stalowa Wola
- Primary School No. 31 in Gdańsk (since 2002, Middle School No. 25)

Cities where there are streets Colonel Stanisław Dąbek: Bielsko-Biała, Bolesławiec, Częstochowa, Elbląg, Gdańsk, Gdynia, Kielce, Koszalin, Kraków, Lubaczów, Nisko, Pruszcz Gdański, Reda, Rumia, Starogard Gdański, Tarnów, Warsaw, Wejherowo, Władysławowo, Wrocław, Zabrze.

Honorary Citizen of Lubaczów (1929).

In 1969, the shipyard. The Paris Commune in Gdynia was built by general cargo, who was named "Colonel Dąbek" on August 30, 1969. The ship was operated by Polish Ocean Lines from 1970 to 1992.

In September 1984 Polish Post issued a postage stamp no. 2786 - Obrona Kępy Oksywskiej; col. Stanisław Dąbek. It was the first of 17 stamps in the 1939 Defense War series.

In 1989 Mennica Polska introduced into circulation a medal minted in a tombak depicting Colonel Dąbek and Lądowa Obrona Wybrzeża. It was made according to the design of Zbigniew Kotyłło, in two versions: patinated, silver-plated and oxidized. The medal was issued by the Defense Knowledge Society as part of the series "Outstanding leaders and commanders in the history of Polish military".

There was also a film about Colonel Dąbek and his soldiers (a fictionalized documentary), produced in 2009 by Polish Television; author of the script and director Bartosz Paduch. The role of the main character was played by an actor, Bogdan Smagacki.

On the 75th anniversary of the death of Colonel Dąbek, the biography of the commander Lądowa Obrony Wybrzeża by dr. Zygmunt Kubrak under the title "General Stanisław Dąbek".

== Promotions ==
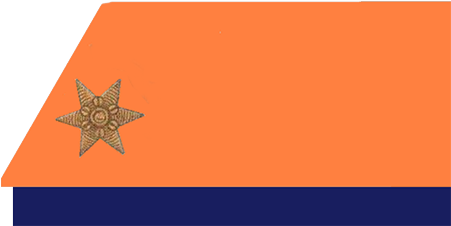
- Leutnant (Second lieutenant)
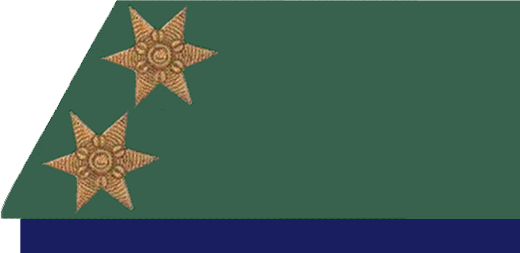
- Oberleutnant (First lieutenant)
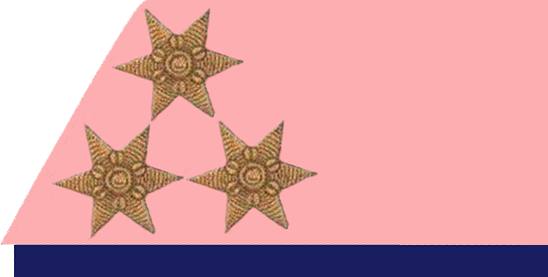
- Hauptmann (Captain)
- Major (Major) - 1 April 1920
- Podpułkownik (Lieutenant colonel) - 1 December 1924
- Pułkownik (Colonel) - 1 January 1932
- Generał brygady (Brigadier general) - posthumously, 1964

== Awards ==
- Order of the Cross of Grunwald, 2nd Class (posthumously)
- Gold Cross of Virtuti Militari
- Silver Cross of Virtuti Militari (1921)
- Cross of Independence (29 December 1933)
- Officer's Cross of the Order of Polonia Restituta (11 November 1937)
- Cross of Valour (twice, for the first time in 1921)
- Gold Cross of Merit (1928)
- Commemorative Medal for the War of 1918-1921
- Medal of the Decade of Regained Independence
- Military Medal (United Kingdom, 1930)

== Bibliography ==
- One-day training of the 14th Infantry Regiment on the 16th anniversary of the uprising: 1918-27 October 1934. Włocławek. 1934.
- Officer's Yearbook 1923. Warsaw: Ministry of Military Affairs. 1923. 119157.
- Officer's Yearbook 1924. Warsaw: Ministry of Military Affairs. 1924. 59165.
- Officer's Yearbook 1928. Warsaw: Ministry of Military Affairs. 1928. 59431.
- Officer's Yearbook 1932. Warsaw: Ministry of Military Affairs. 1932. 59691.
- Stanisław Strumph Wojtkiewicz, 'Alarm for Gdynia', Publishing House of the Ministry of National Defense, Warsaw 1977. ISBN 83-11-06767-8.
- Edmund Kosiarz, "Obrona Kępy Oksywskiej", Book and Knowledge, Warsaw 1984. ISBN 83-05-11136-9.
- Wacław Tym, Andrzej Rzepniewski, Kępa Oksywska 1939 Accounts of land fighters , Wydawnictwo Morskie, Gdańsk 1985. ISBN 83-215-7210-3.
- Stanisław Jaczyński, Col. Stanisław Dąbek, Bellona, Warsaw 1990.
- Jurga, Tadeusz (1990). Defense of Poland 1939. Warsaw: PAX Publishing Institute. p. 759. ISBN 83-211-1096-7.
- Jan Łukasiak, "Infantry Reserve Officer Cadet School", Ajaks, Pruszków 1999. ISBN 83-88773-68-2.
- Grzegorz Piwnicki, Bogdan Zalewski, "Polish military maritime policy from the 10th to the end of the 20th century". Naval Command - Social and Educational Division. Gdynia 2002. ISBN 83-88698-25-7.
- An article by Włodzimierz Kalicki about General Stanisław Dąbek in Gazeta Wyborcza [accessed on 2007-01-22].
- Film Colonel Dąbek. Defense of Gdynia 1939, dir. Bartosz Paduch, TVP 2009.
- Zygmunt Kubrak, "General Stanisław Dąbek", Podkarpacki Book and Marketing Institute, Rzeszów 2014. ISBN 978-83-63706-28-9.
