= ORP Błyskawica =

Grom-class destroyer

Coordinates: 54°31.171′N 18°33.071′E

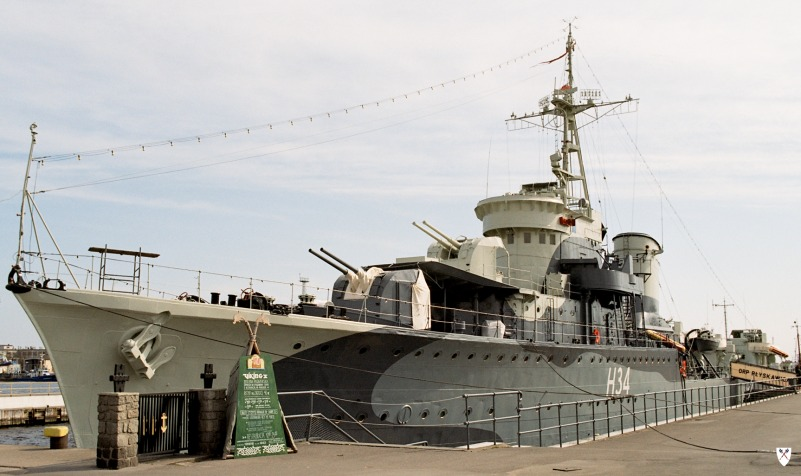
- ORP Błyskawica, modern view

History

Poland
- Name: ORP Błyskawica
- Builder: J. Samuel White, East Cowes
- Laid down: September 1935
- Launched: 1 October 1936
- Commissioned: 25 November 1937
- Decommissioned: 1 May 1976
- Honours and awards: Virtuti Militari, 4th Class; Pro Memoria Medal
- Status: Museum ship

General characteristics
- Class & type: Grom-class destroyer
- Displacement: 2,011 long tons (2,043 t) standard; 2,520 long tons (2,560 t) full
- Length: 114 m (374 ft 0 in)
- Beam: 11.3 m (37 ft 1 in)
- Draft: 3.3 m (10 ft 10 in)
- Speed: 39 knots (72 km/h; 45 mph)
- Complement: 192
- Armament: 1937: 7 × 4.7 in (120 mm) (3 × 2, 1 × 1); 4 × 40 mm AA (2 × 2); 8 × 13.2 mm MG (4 × 2); 6 × 21 in (533 mm) torpedo tubes (2 × 3); Depth charge throwers; 1941: 8 × QF 4-inch (101.6 mm) Mk XVI dual-purpose guns; 4 × 40 mm (1.6 in) AA guns; 4 × 20 mm (0.79 in) AA guns; 6 × torpedo tubes; 1951/52: 8 × 100 mm (3.9 in)/56 B-34 guns (4 x 2); 2 × 37 mm (1.5 in) 70-K AA guns (2 x 1); 8 × 37 mm (1.5 in) V-11 AA guns (4 x 2); 3 × 533.4 mm torpedo tubes (1 x 3)

ORP Błyskawica (Polish for Lightning) is a Grom-class destroyer which served in the Polish Navy during World War II. She is the only Polish Navy ship to have been decorated with the Virtuti Militari, Poland's highest military order for gallantry, and in 2012 was given the Pro Memoria Medal. Błyskawica is preserved as a museum ship in Gdynia and is the oldest preserved destroyer in the world. Błyskawica is moored next to the Dar Pomorza.

She was the second of the two Grom (Thunderbolt)-class destroyers built for the Polish Navy by J. Samuel White, of Cowes, in 1935–1937. The Grom class were two of the most heavily armed and fastest destroyers in World War II.

== Construction and design ==
In 1934 the British shipbuilder J. Samuel White won a competition to design and build large destroyers for the Polish Navy, beating a proposal from fellow British shipbuilder Swan Hunter. (A design by the French shipyard Ateliers et Chantiers de la Loire had been rejected in 1933). An order for two destroyers of the Grom class was placed on 29 March 1935.

At the turn of the 1920s and 1930s, the Naval Directorate (KMW) made efforts to acquire other destroyers after the Wicher and Burza. The 1932 Danzig crisis led to a navalist turn in Poland, and Poland's de facto leader, Marshal Józef Piłsudski, became more willing to allocate funds for the navy. On November 24, 1932, the head of the KMW Rear Admiral Jerzy Świrski obtained, after a personal conversation with Marshal Piłsudski, his oral consent to expand the existing fleet. As a result, in May 1933, a tender for the supply of two destroyers was issued among the French shipyards, and after its fiasco, the next in January 1934 among the Swedish shipyards, also failed in disagreement. During this time, tactical and technical assumptions for the planned ships crystallized, including, among others, the use of 120 mm Bofors guns as their primary armament.

When they were built, the Groms were amongst the fastest and most heavily armed destroyers to be built. Błyskawica was 114 metres (374 ft 0 in) long overall and 109 metres (357 ft 7 in) between perpendiculars, with a beam of 11.3 metres (37 ft 1 in) and a draught of 3.1 metres (10 ft 2 in). Displacement was 2,011 long tons (2,043 t) standard and 2,520 long tons (2,560 t) full load. Three 3-drum boilers fed steam to two sets of geared steam turbines which were rated at 54,500 shaft horsepower (40,600 kW), driving two propeller shafts to give a design speed of 39 knots (72 km/h; 45 mph). Main gun armament consisted of seven 120 mm (4.7 in) guns (50 calibre M34/36 guns supplied by Bofors of Sweden) in three twin and one single mounts, with an anti-aircraft armament of two twin Bofors 40 mm guns and eight 13.2 mm machine guns. Six 550 mm (22 in) torpedo tubes were carried, compatible with the French torpedoes used by the preceding Wicher-class destroyers. Anti-submarine armament consisted of two depth charge chutes with 40 depth charges, while rails were fitted to permit up to 44 mines to be carried. The ship's complement consisted of 180 officers and men.

Błyskawica, the second of the two destroyers, was laid down on 1 October 1935 at J. Samuel White's Cowes, Isle of Wight shipyard, and was launched on 1 October 1936. Sea trials were successful, with the ship exceeding the design speed of 39 knots. Błyskawica was commissioned on 1 October 1937.

=== Modifications ===
ORP Błyskawica, Gdynia 2016

When Błyskawica and Grom arrived in the United Kingdom in September 1939, it was found that the ships, designed for operations in the sheltered Baltic, were top-heavy for operations in the rougher North Atlantic, so the ships were modified to lower the centre of gravity. A searchlight tower on top of the ship's bridge was removed, as was a deck house aft carrying a second searchlight, and the distinctive funnel cap. In addition, the aft set of torpedo tubes was removed to allow fitting of a 76 mm (3 in) anti-aircraft gun. In December 1941, Błyskawica was rearmed, with the 120 mm guns for which ammunition was not available replaced by four twin 102 mm (4 in) Mk XVI dual-purpose guns. The 13.2 mm machine guns were replaced by four Oerlikon 20 mm cannon and the second set of torpedo tubes were reinstated.

== Operational history ==
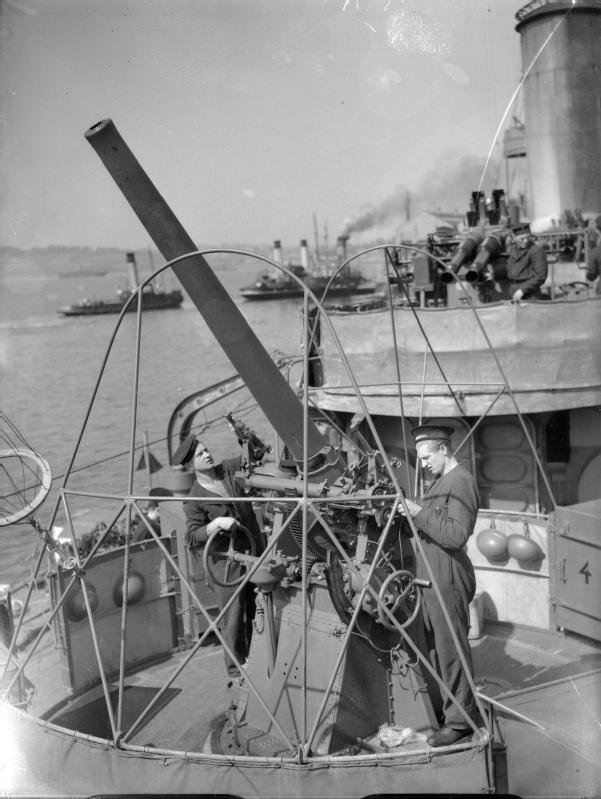
Crew cleaning a 76 mm anti-aircraft gun on ORP Błyskawica, 12 September 1940

Two days before the war, on 30 August 1939, Błyskawica withdrew, along with the destroyers Grom and Burza, from the Baltic Sea to Britain in accordance with the Peking Plan to avoid open conflict with Germany and possible destruction. The three destroyers were sighted by German warships, including the cruiser Königsberg on 30 and 31 August, but hostilities had not yet started, and the Polish destroyers passed by unhindered, reaching Leith in Scotland at 17:30 on 1 September 1939. From then on they acted in tandem with the Royal Navy's Home Fleet. On 7 September 1939, Błyskawica made contact with and attacked an U-boat.

In early May 1940 Błyskawica took part in the Norwegian Campaign, shelling German positions and downing two Luftwaffe aircraft. Her sister ship Grom was bombed and sunk during the campaign. Later that month, she took part in covering Operation Dynamo, the successful British led evacuation from Dunkirk.

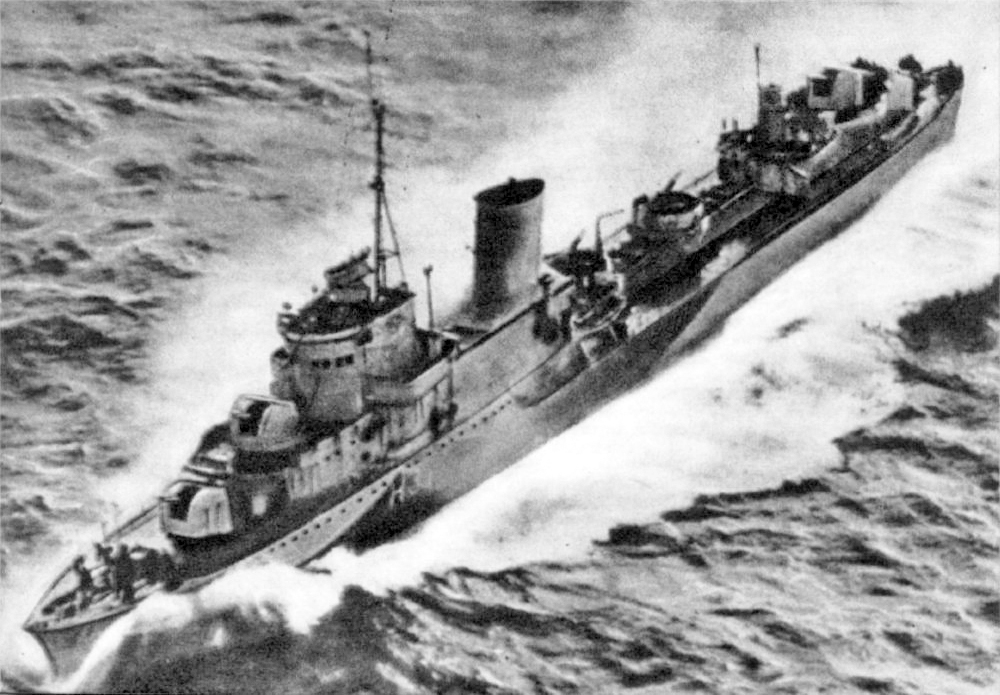
ORP Błyskawica in the Northern Atlantic during World War II

During the rest of the war, Błyskawica took part in convoy and patrol duties, engaging U-boats and the Luftwaffe in the Atlantic and Mediterranean. On 1 September 1940, she rescued the sole survivor from the torpedoed merchant ship Har Zion. In 1941 her 120 mm guns were replaced with British 102 mm (4 in) dual-purpose guns. The ship was also given escort duties for troop transports, notably RMS Queen Mary, being one of the few ships that could keep up with the liner.

On the night of 4–5 May 1942 Błyskawica helped to defend the Isle of Wight town of East Cowes from an air raid by 160 German bombers. The ship was undergoing an emergency refit at the J. Samuel White yard where she had been built and, on the night of the raid, fired repeated rounds at the German bombers from outside the harbour; her guns became so hot they had to be doused with water from the River Medina to keep them from overheating. Extra ammunition had to be ferried over from Portsmouth. The intervention of Błyskawica forced the bombers to stay high, making it difficult for them to target properly. The ship also laid down a smokescreen hiding Cowes from sight, further compounding the difficulty the bomber crews faced in targeting it. The town and the shipyard were badly damaged, but it is generally considered that without this defensive action, it would have been far worse. In 2002 the crew's courage was honoured by a local commemoration lasting several days to mark the 60th anniversary of the event.

In 2004 an area of Cowes was named Francki Place in honour of the ship's commander. The Isle of Wight Council approved the idea of having Błyskawica return to Cowes in 2012 to celebrate the 70th anniversary of the event and the 75th anniversary of the ship's commissioning. There were large celebrations commemorating the 70th anniversary of Cowes's defence in 2012 lasting several days and attended by Polish warship ORP Toruń. Another large event to commemorate Błyskawica's 75th anniversary was organised by Friends of the ORP Błyskawica Society in May 2017, the Polish Navy minelayer ORP Gniezno arrived at the port to take part in the celebrations.

In March 1943 Błyskawica replaced HMS Lightning, which was sunk by E-boats on 12 March 1943, in Cruiser Force Q based at Bône, North Africa. In January 1944 the Błyskawica was assigned to the Anglo-Polish-Canadian 10th Destroyer Flotilla that battled the Kriegsmarine for the control of the English Channel. The Canadian sailors could not pronounce the name of the Błyskawica correctly and always called her the "bottle of whiskey". On 8 June 1944, the Błyskawica took part in the Battle of Ushant against Kriegsmarine destroyers.

During the war she logged 146,000 nautical miles (270,000 km) and escorted 83 convoys. In combat she damaged three U-boats, helped sink other ships, and shot down at least four aircraft. In late 1945 and early 1946 Błyskawica, along with the destroyer Onslow, took part in Operation Deadlight, the scuttling of over 100 German U-boats.

In the spring of 1947 Błyskawica was transferred to the new Polish government, but it was not until 1 July 1947 that she sailed out of Rosyth under the Polish People's Navy flag. A few days later on 4 July Błyskawica docked in Gdynia.

In the first few years of its return to Poland, Błyskawica was used as a training ship and cruised with officer cadets on board. In 1951 Błyskawica visited Leningrad.

In 1951–1952 Błyskawica was modernized. The ship's British 4-inch gun barrels were replaced by Soviet B-34 100 mm gun barrels in the same mountings to allow Soviet ammunition to be used, while Soviet 37 mm AA guns in four twin and two single mountings replaced the old 40 mm and 20 mm mountings. A single Soviet triple 533.4 mm torpedo tube mount replaced the British mount. Soviet radar was added, including a Soviet copy of the British type 291 radar set.

In September 1955 ORP Błyskawica along with ORP Burza paid a courtesy visit to Portsmouth, England. In July 1957, Błyskawica, along with two Kronshtadt-class submarine chasers visited Stockholm, Sweden. During this visit, two Polish sailors jumped ship and asked for political asylum in Sweden.

Błyskawica underwent a second modernization in late 1957–1960 to address issues with her propulsion system as well as radio and electronic equipment and updated radar. At the same time, her Soviet B-34 100 mm main guns were replaced with upgraded B-34 U 100mm guns.

ORP Błyskawica continued to make courtesy visits to foreign ports in the decade of the 60s. She made a visit to Helsinki, Finland in 1961, followed by a visit to Greenwich, England in 1962. In September 1963, Błyskawica made a port call to Copenhagen, Denmark. The ship also visited Chatham, England in 1964 and Narvik, Norway in 1965.

On August 9, 1967, destroyer Błyskawica had a tragic accident at sea while on an exercise. A high-pressure steam pipe ruptured in one of her boiler rooms, killing seven sailors. After this accident, Błyskawica remained immobilized and it was decided she would not undergo repairs. Instead, she was reclassified as an anti-aircraft defence ship for the port of Świnoujście in June 1969.

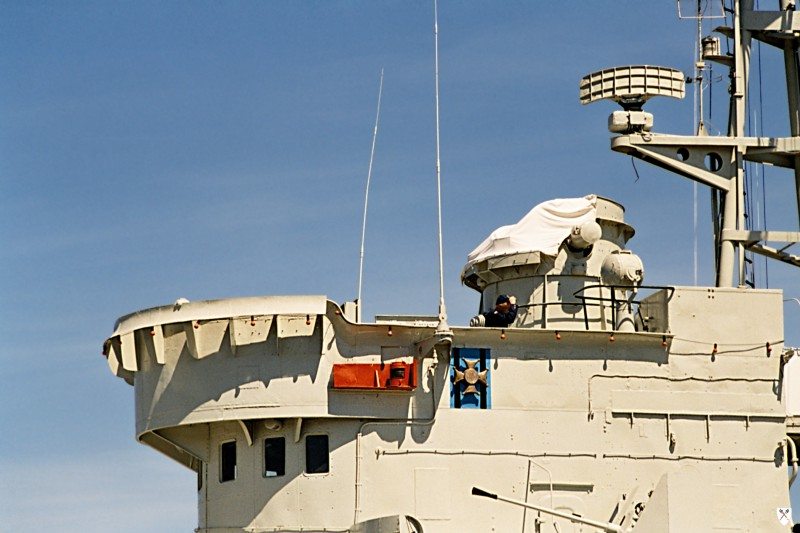
Bridge of ORP Błyskawica decorated with Golden Cross of the Order Virtuti Militari

In May 1976 she became a museum ship, part of the Naval Museum in Gdynia – replacing the other WW2 veteran, the ageing ORP Burza.

In July 2006 the preserved Canadian destroyer HMCS Haida was "twinned" with Błyskawica in a ceremony in Gdynia, Poland. Both ships served in the 10th Destroyer Flotilla during the Second World War. The ceremony was attended by former crew members of both ships and the general public. The ship was visited in 2009 by Prince Charles, Prince of Wales (now King Charles III), and his wife, Camilla, Duchess of Cornwall (now Queen Camilla), and on 29 June 2010, at Government House in Nova Scotia, Prince Philip, Duke of Edinburgh, presented to representatives of HMCS Haida the World Ship Trust Certificate.
