= ORP Grom (1936) =

1936 Grom-class destroyer

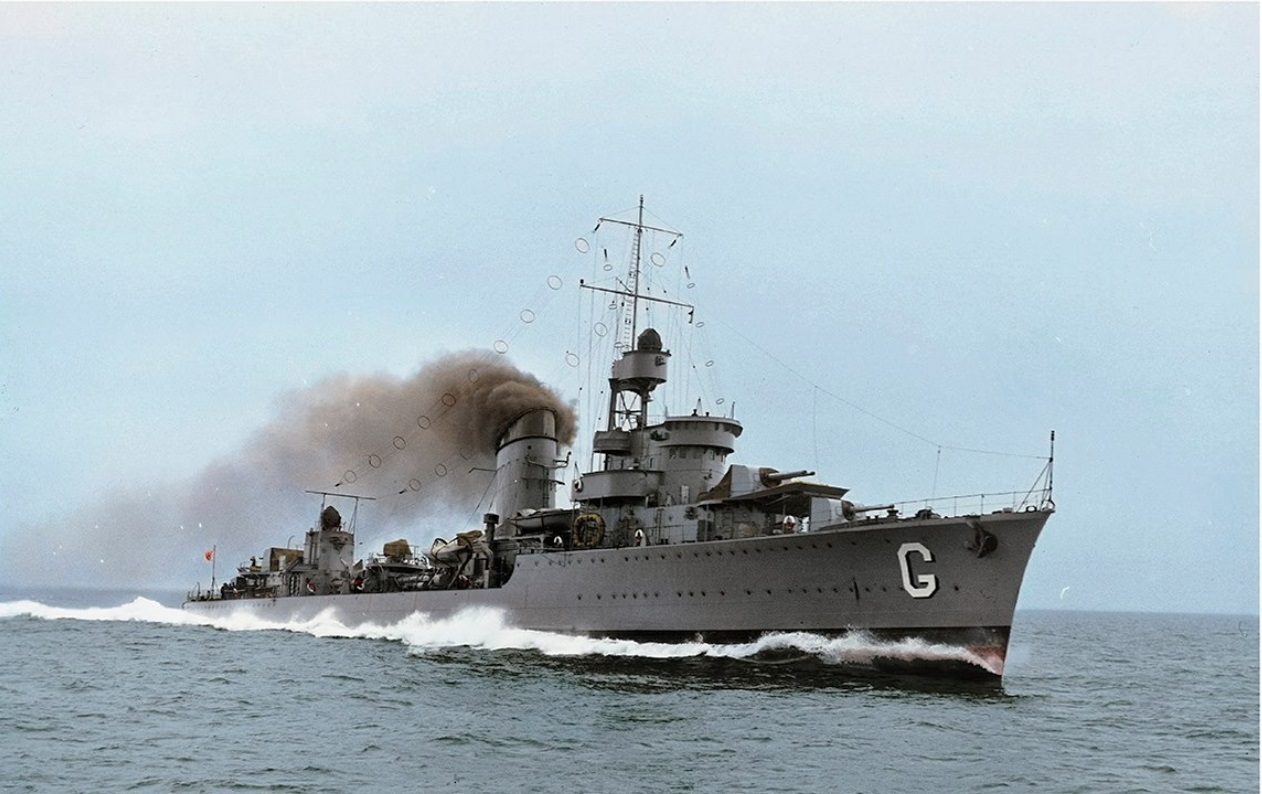
- ORP Grom

History

Poland
- Name: ORP Grom
- Namesake: Thunderbolt
- Laid down: 17 July 1935
- Launched: 20 July 1936
- Commissioned: 11 May 1937
- Out of service: 4 May 1940
- Fate: Sunk in the Rombaken fjord near Narvik, Norway

General characteristics
- Class & type: Grom-class destroyer
- Displacement: 1,975 tons standard; 2,183 tons normal; 2,400 tons full
- Length: 114 m (374 ft)
- Beam: 11.3 m (37 ft 1 in)
- Draft: 3.3 m (10 ft 10 in)
- Propulsion: Two Parsons' steam turbines of 54,000 shp (40,000 kW) altogether, 3 boilers and 2 shafts
- Speed: 39 knots (72 km/h; 45 mph)
- Range: 3,500 nmi (6,500 km; 4,000 mi) at 15 kn (28 km/h; 17 mph)
- Complement: 192
- Armament: 7 × 120 mm (4.7 in) Bofors wz. 34/36 guns; 2 × double 40 mm (1.6 in) AA Bofors guns; 4 × double 13.2 mm AA Hotchkiss HMG; 6 × 550 mm (22 in)/533 mm (21.0 in) torpedo tubes; 2 × depth charge launchers, 20 wz. BH 200 bombs; 44 naval mines

ORP Grom was the lead ship of her class of destroyers serving in the Polish Navy during World War II. She was named after the Polish word for Thunder or Thunderbolt, while her sister ship ORP Błyskawica translates to lightning bolt.

== Design ==
Grom was thought of as a large destroyer, similar to flotilla leaders. She and sister ship ORP Błyskawica were to support the outdated French-built Wicher and Burza in the role of the core of the Polish Navy in a possible conflict. As Poland had only one major seaport, the main task of the Polish naval forces was to secure supplies shipment to and from allied countries. Because of that, the Grom class was designed to fulfill both the role of shore defence and convoy escort and was supposed to be stronger than single enemy destroyers.

Two Parsons steam turbines of 54,000 shaft horsepower (40,000 kW) altogether, three boilers and two shafts allowed Grom to travel at 39 knots (72 km/h; 45 mph), faster than the contemporary designs like the US Farragut and Porter classes, the British Tribal class, or the German Type 1934s. Also, as it was not clear whether the ships would be used to secure convoys to the Polish port of Gdynia or the Romanian port of Constanţa (through the Romanian Bridgehead), the possible range was much larger than in the case of destroyers designed exclusively for the Baltic Sea. The ship had an effective range of 3,500 nautical miles (6,500 km; 4,000 mi) at 15 knots (28 km/h; 17 mph).

== Construction and career ==
Grom was ordered from the British J. Samuel White shipyard in Cowes and was laid down in 1935. The destroyer was commissioned in 1937.

The commanders of the ship were:

- Lieutenant Commander Stanisław Hryniewiecki - January 25, 1937 - June 20, 1938
- Commander Aleksander Hulewicz - March 13 or. June 20, 1938 - May 4, 1940

On 30 August 1939, the Polish destroyers Błyskawica, Burza, and Grom were ordered to activate the Peking Plan, and the warships headed for Great Britain, from where they were to operate as convoy escorts. On 1 September 1939, Polish destroyers met with the British destroyers Wanderer and Wallace. The British ships led the Polish flotilla to Leith, and in the night the Polish destroyers came to Rosyth.

During her operations in the Norwegian Campaign, Grom was ranked by the German soldiers as probably the most hated of all the Allied ships deployed to the area. This hatred was founded on the fact that Grom took an intense interest in all hostile movements on shore and was reputed to spend hours lurking the coast in order to harass German forces. On 4 May 1940, Grom carried out what turned out to be the last of her many naval gunfire support missions in the Narvik area in the Rombaken fjord. She was attacked by a Heinkel He 111 bomber from Kampfgeschwader 100 (piloted by Lt. Korthals). Grom was hit by two bombs and sank after internal explosion.

The wreck was never raised and it was not until 6 October 1986 that it was explored by divers for the first time.

== War memorial ==
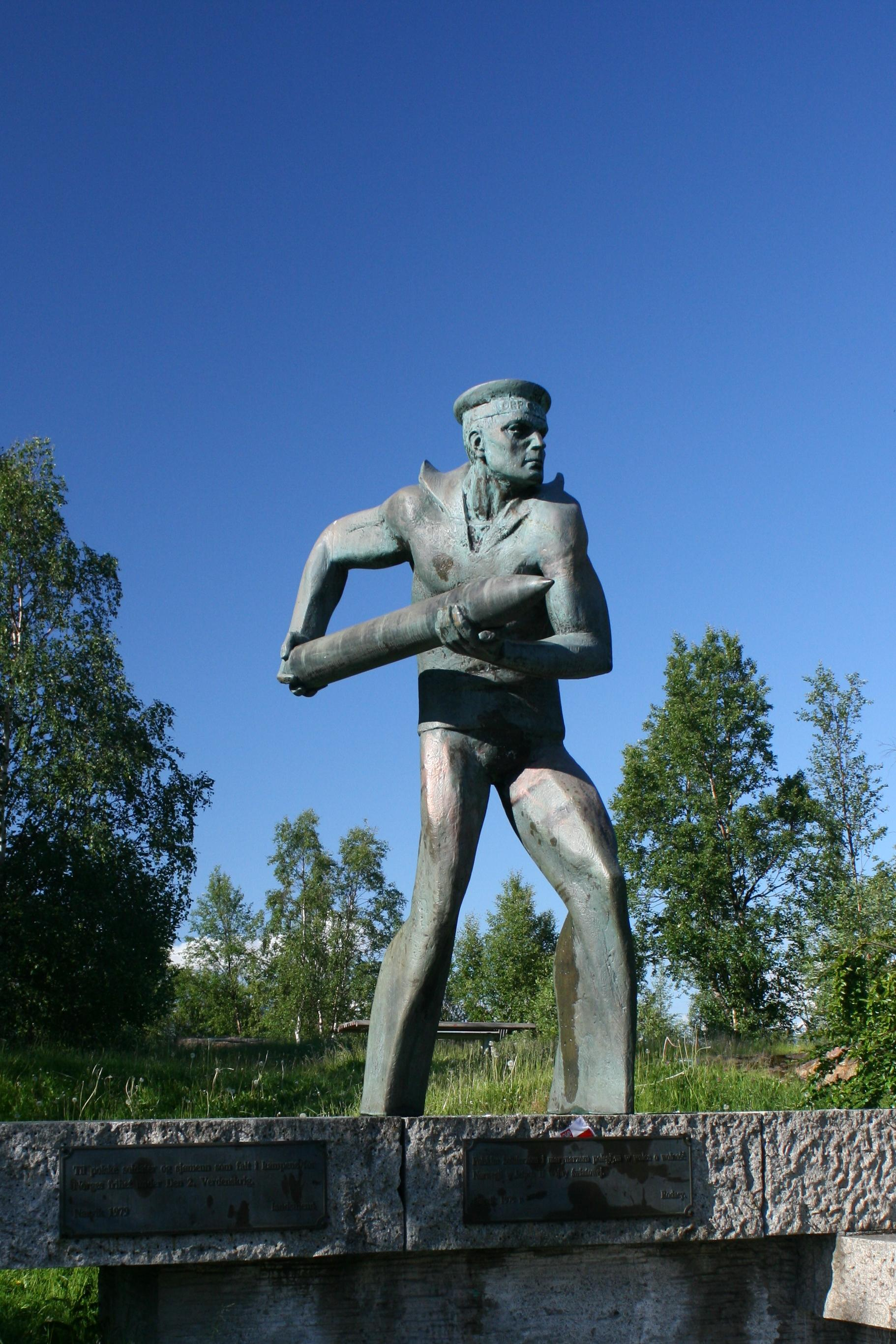
ORP Grom's war memorial.

A war memorial for Polish soldiers and sailors who fell during the Battles of Narvik was erected in 1979 on the 40th anniversary of the outbreak of the second world war. The memorial is located in Groms plass in Narvik, a park named after Grom.
