= Oksywie =

- District of Gdynia
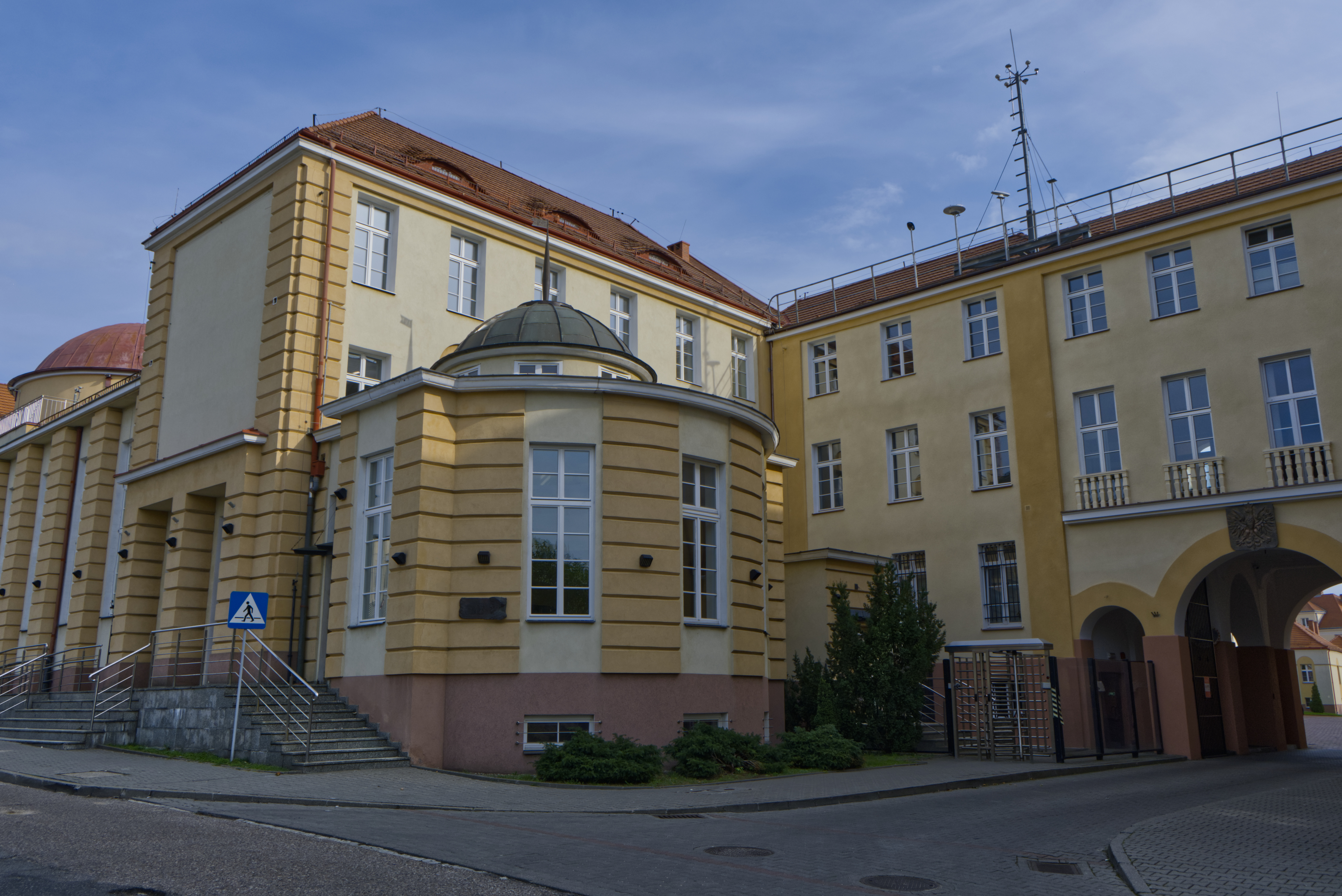
- Polish Navy Headquarter in Oksywie

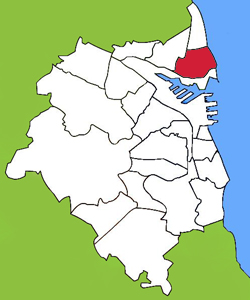
- Location of Oksywie within Gdynia
- Coordinates: 54.5480°N 18.5446°E
- Country: Poland
- Voivodeship: Pomeranian
- County/City: Gdynia
- Within city limits: 1926

Area
  - Total: 4.37 km^{2} (1.69 sq mi)

Population (2022)
  - Total: 14,376
  - Density: 3,290/km^{2} (8,520/sq mi)
- Time zone: UTC+1 (CET)
  - Summer (DST): UTC+2 (CEST)
- Vehicle registration: GA

Oksywie (German: Oxhöft, Kashubian: Òksëwiô) is a district of the city of Gdynia, Pomeranian Voivodeship, northern Poland. Formerly a separate settlement, it is older than Gdynia by several centuries.

Oksywie is notable as the location of the Polish Naval Academy and one of the bases of the Polish Navy. It was also the namesake of ORP Oksywie.

== Etymology ==
Both the Polish and then German name of the town, as well as various other names for it used in the past (among them Oxsiua, Oxive, Okciua, Oxue, Oxivia, Oxiuia, Oxiwia, Oxiew and Oxivija) stem from a Scandinavian word oxihoved meaning oxen head.

== History ==
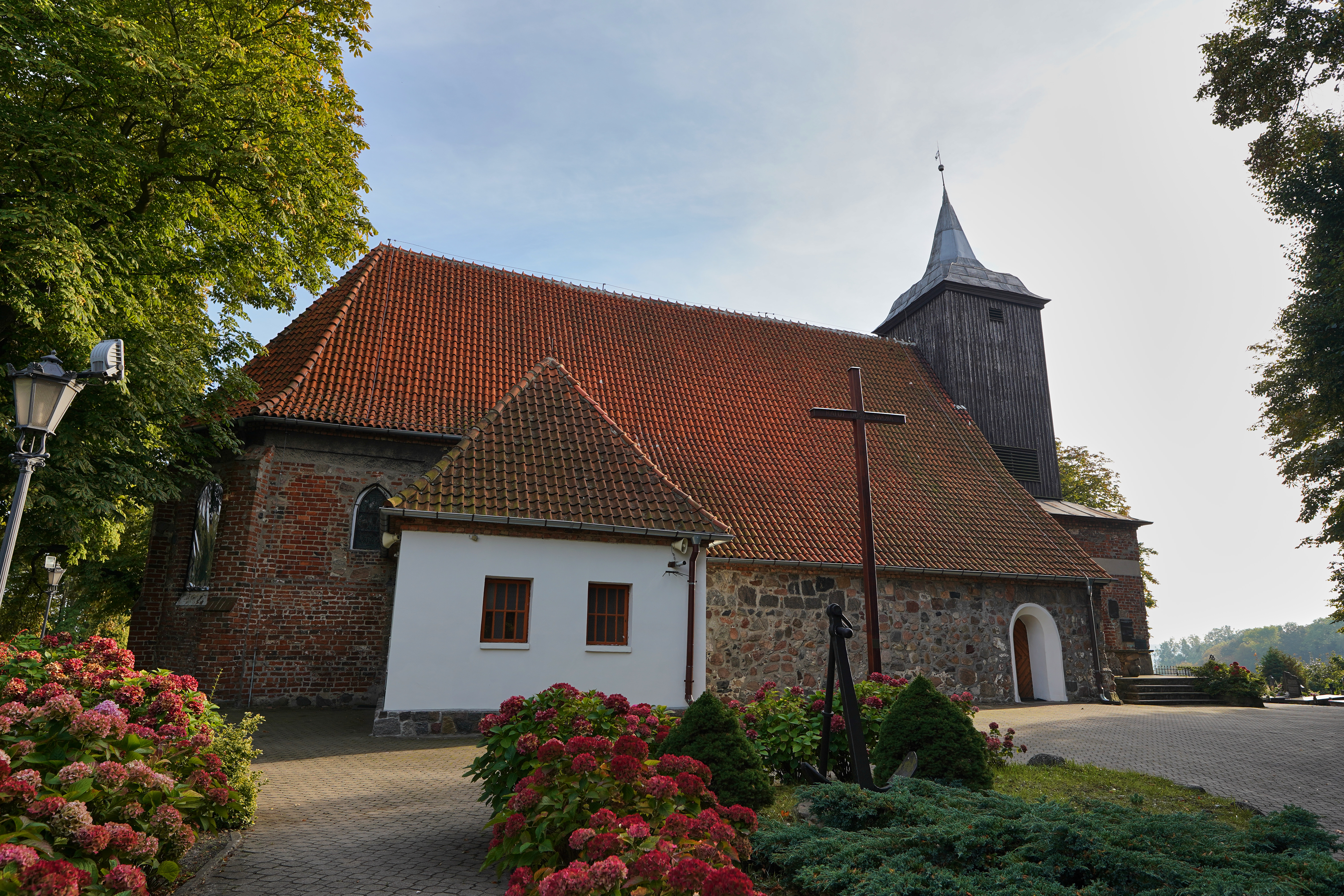
Medieval Saint Michael Archangel church, the oldest building in Oksywie

In prehistoric times members of the Oksywie culture, named after their burial places located just outside Oksywie, settled Oksywie Heights overlooking the Bay of Gdańsk. In time the area was settled by Slavs and became part of Pomerania. It became part of the emerging Polish state under its first ruler, Mieszko I, in the 10th century. Christianised relatively early, the settlement housed a Catholic shrine erected in 1224 by Swietopelk I, Duke of Pomerania. The settlement shared much of its history with the surrounding region and with the nearby city of Gdańsk, which developed into a regional capital. Oksywie was a possession of the Premonstratensian Monastery in Żukowo, administratively located in the Puck County of the Pomeranian Voivodeship of the Kingdom of Poland.

Historical population
Year	Pop.
1921	890
2022	14,376

After World War I, when Poland regained the area after 123 years of partitions of Poland, Oksywie became the first base of the Polish Navy, as which it served until the outbreak of World War II. During the German invasion of Poland of 1939, the area was the battlefield of the nine-day battle of Kępa Oksywska, in which the Polish forces under Stanisław Dąbek defended the area between September 10 and September 19. During the last stages of the war, the area yet again became a battlefield, this time between March 28 and April 5, 1945, when the Oksywie Heights became the last stand of the surrounded German forces in Pomerania.

== Sights ==
Landmarks of Oksywie include the medieval Saint Michael Archangel church, which is the oldest church of Gdynia, and the Polish Navy Cemetery.
