= Battle of Kępa Oksywska =

1939 battle during the German invasion of Poland in WWII

Coordinates: 54°32′55″N 18°32′46″E

- Part of Invasion of Poland
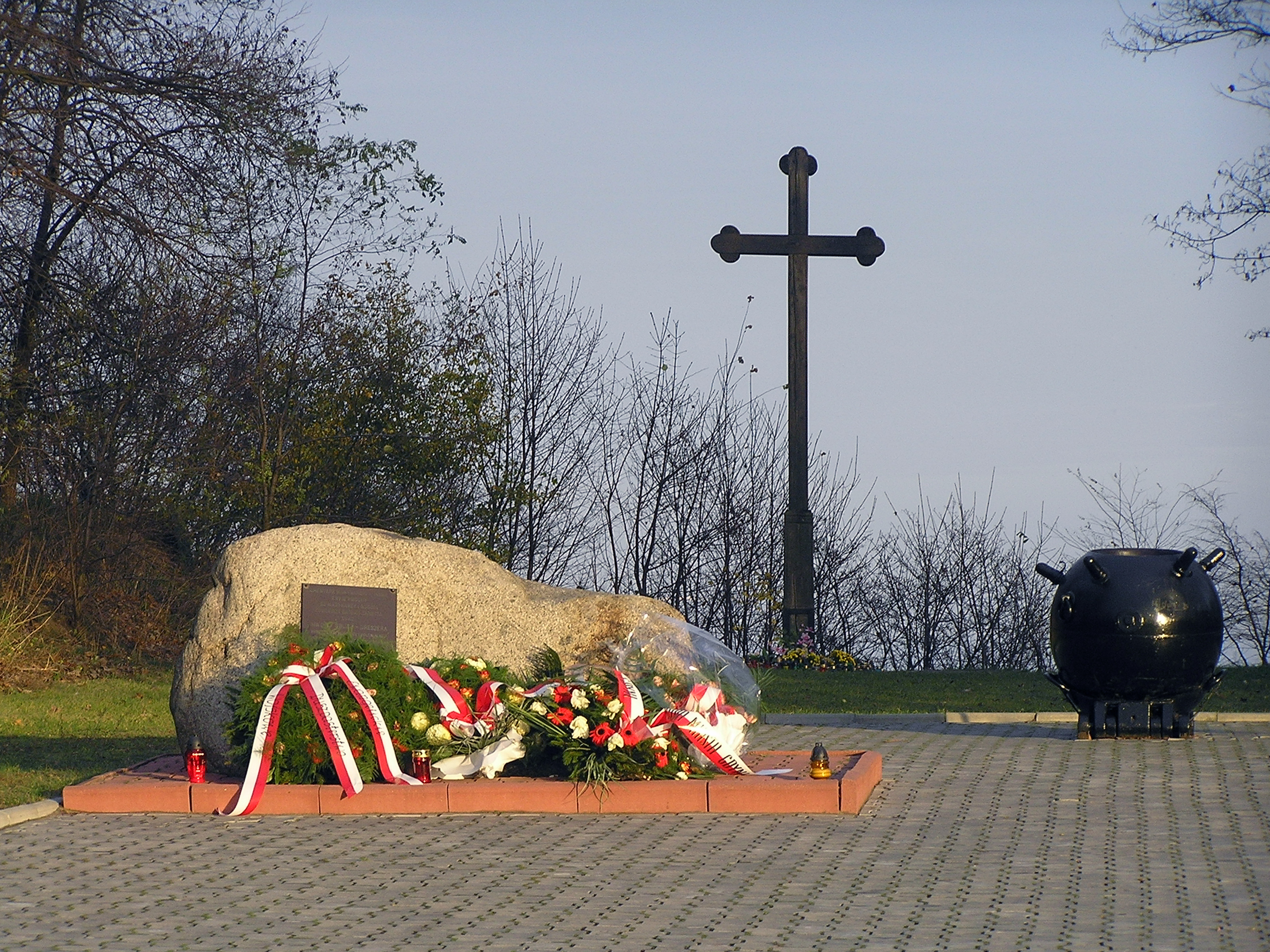
- Monument to Maj Gen Gustaw Orlicz-Dreszer and soldiers of "Canet" Battery on the Polish Navy Cemetery in Gdynia.
Date	10–19 September 1939
Location	Oksywie Heights, near Gdynia, Pomeranian Voivodeship, Poland
Result	German victory

Belligerents
Germany	Poland

Commanders and leaders
(Nazi Germany) Leonhard Kaupisch	(Second Polish Republic) Stanisław Dąbek †

Strength
38,000 (Note: This includes the soldiers used at the Battle of Hel.)	15,000

Casualties and losses
Unknown	2,000 KIA; 7,000 WIA

The Battle of Kępa Oksywska took place in the Oksywie Heights outside the Polish city of Gdynia between 10 and 19 September 1939. The battle, fought by the Polish Army and the German Wehrmacht, was part of the Polish September Campaign during World War II. It was one of the bloodiest battles of the campaign, with Polish KIA losses reaching roughly 14% of all the forces engaged.

== The battle ==
=== German advance on Gdynia ===
On 10 September, after a series of skirmishes in the vicinity of Reda at the western outskirts of Gdynia, the Polish commander of the Land Coastal Defence forces, pułkownik Stanisław Dąbek, was in a difficult position. His forces, centred on the port of Gdynia, were forced to wage a two-front war against the German forces advancing both from the west and from the territory of the Free City of Danzig. The main part of his forces was facing the German forces under General der Flieger Leonhard Kaupisch, advancing from the east along the shores of the Gdańsk Bay. At the same time a smaller detachment of the Polish forces prepared a stand in the area of Oksywie, where the German forces managed to cut the Poles out of the nearby Hel Peninsula. Thus Gdynia was besieged.

=== Positional fighting ===
Although the Polish forces managed to halt the German blitzkrieg and the fighting resembled World War I on the western front, the besieged garrison was suffering heavy losses and desperately needed to shorten its front lines. As there was no chance of relief of the besieged Polish forces by a strong force from the Polish mainland, the Heights offered a decent defensive position. Although completely unprepared for defence, the area was densely forested and made enemy penetration and aerial and naval bombardment much more difficult.

=== Polish withdrawal to Oksywie Heights ===
In order to spare the city from destruction in the event likely urban combat, on 12 September Col. Dąbek ordered all of his forces to withdraw to Oksywie Heights to the north-east of the town, thus abandoning Gdynia. Until 14 September all Polish forces, by then reduced to roughly 9,000 servicemen, gradually withdrew to the area, along with up to 140 HMGs, 14 mortars, 23 pieces of artillery and a large number of civilian refugees. Massed in an area no greater than 4 km^{2}, the Poles were able to inflict heavy losses on the numerically and technically superior enemy. Until 19 September there were no less than 110 skirmishes fought in an area of less than 4 square kilometres.

=== Cease-fire ===
However, constant aerial bombardment and lack of supplies and reinforcements finally forced Col. Dąbek to order a cease-fire on 19 September. By then the Polish casualties amounted to roughly 2,000 dead and 7,000 wounded, and there were hardly any unwounded soldiers. Col. Dąbek then committed suicide.

== See also ==
- List of World War II military equipment of Poland
- List of German military equipment of World War II
