= Koleczkowo =

- Village
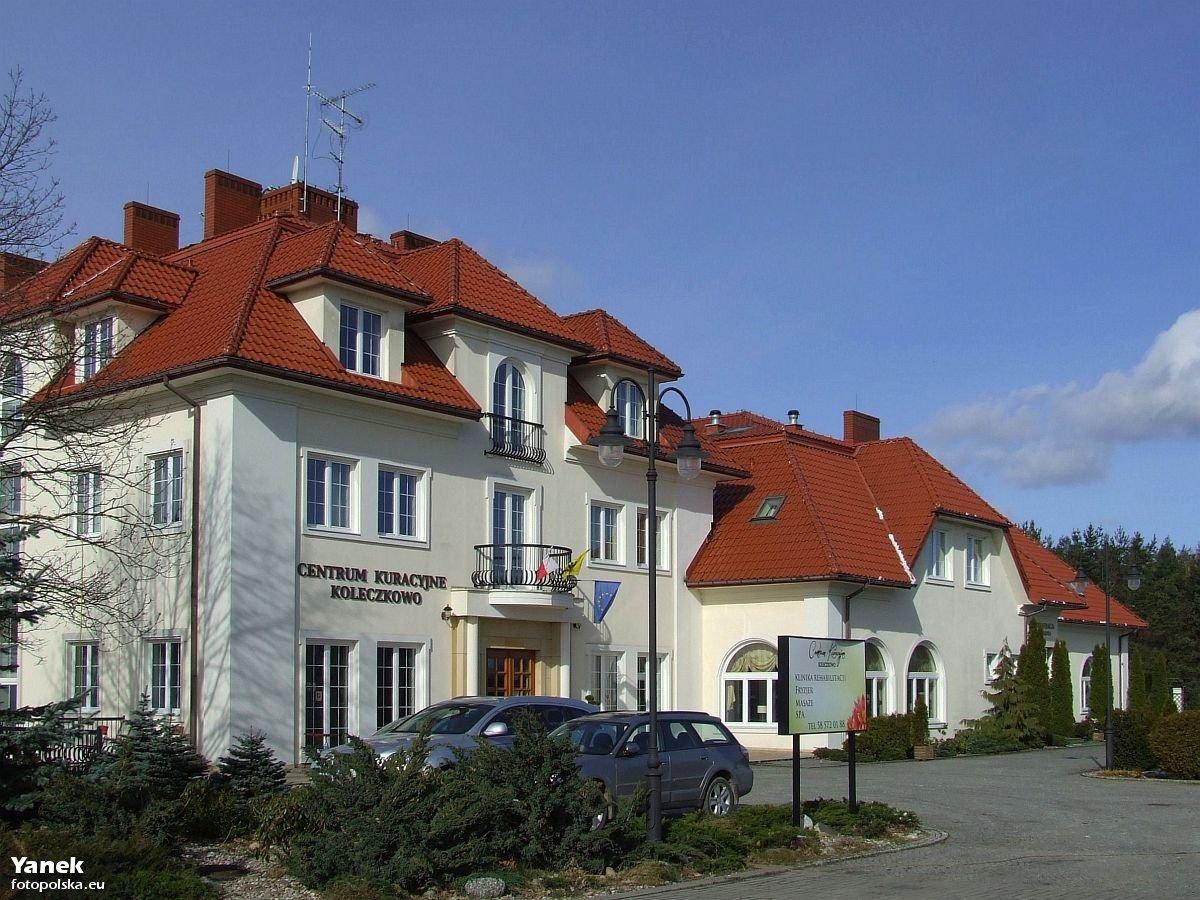
- Rehabilitation Center in Koleczkowo

- Location within Poland
- Coordinates: 54°29′16″N 18°20′30″E
- Country: Poland
- Voivodeship: Pomeranian
- County: Wejherowo
- Gmina: Szemud
- Population: 1,750
- Time zone: UTC+1 (CET)
  - Summer (DST): UTC+2 (CEST)

Koleczkowo [kɔlɛt͡ʂˈkɔvɔ] is a village in the administrative district of Gmina Szemud, within Wejherowo County, Pomeranian Voivodeship, in northern Poland. It is located within the historic region of Pomerania.

== History ==
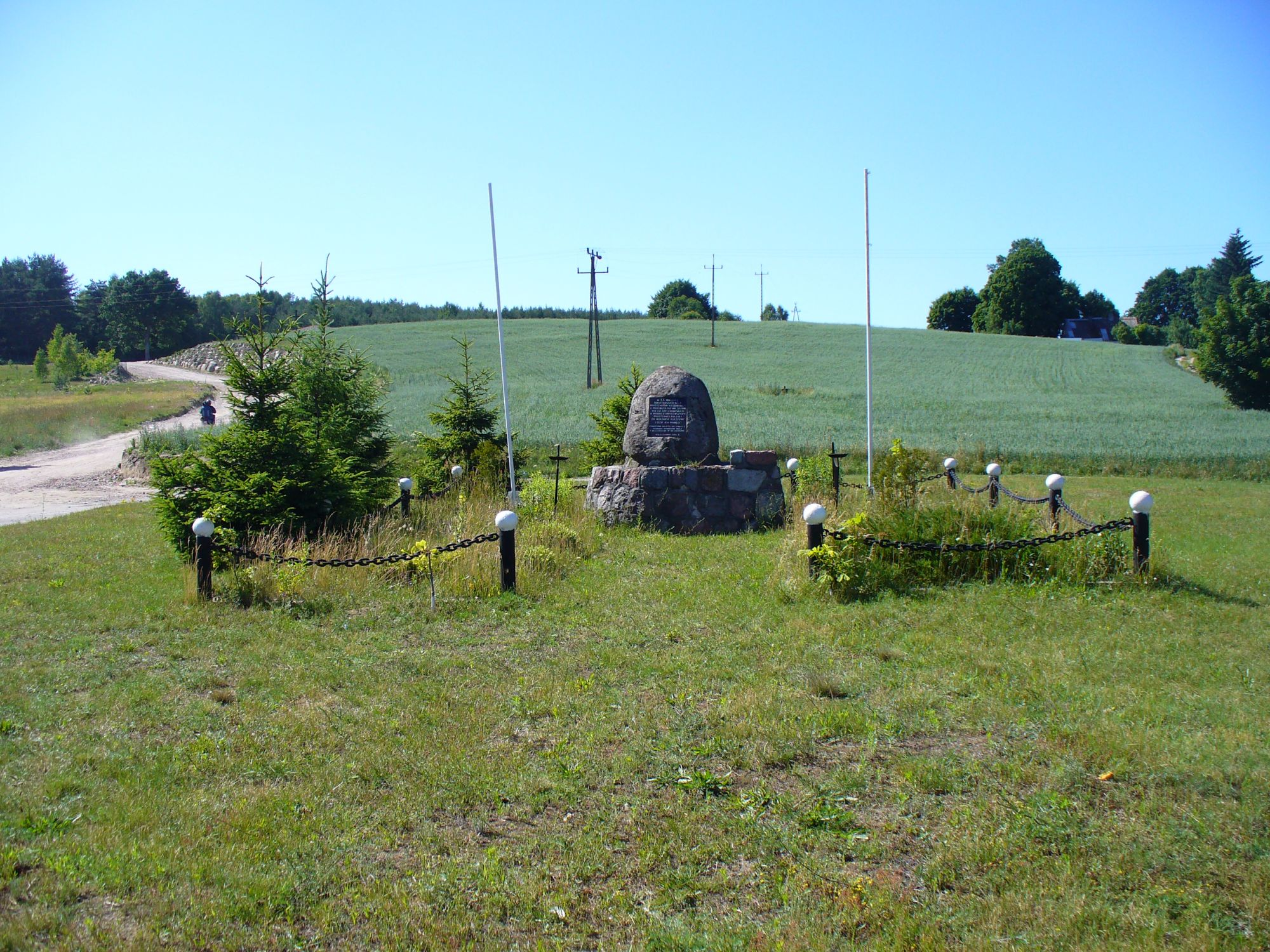
Memorial of the 1944 battle in Koleczkowo

Koleczkowo was a royal village of the Polish Crown, administratively located in the Gdańsk County in the Pomeranian Voivodeship.

During German occupation of Poland (World War II), in 1944, Koleczkowo was the site of a battle between the Polish underground resistance movement and the German occupiers. There is a memorial commemorating the battle in the village.

== Notable people ==
- Alfred Loeper (1912–1944), Polish military officer, activist, member of the Pomeranian Griffin Polish secret resistance organization during the German occupation of Poland (World War II)
