= Stanisław Panczakiewicz =

Polish engineer, designer

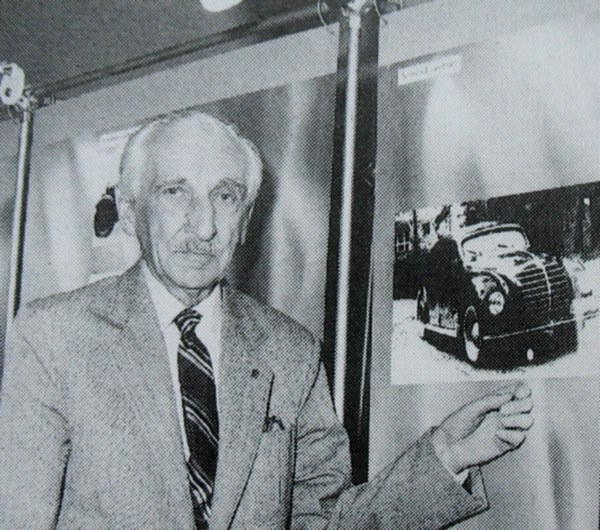
- Stanisław Panczakiewicz with a photo of the Lux-Sport
- Born: April 11, 1900; Warsaw, Poland
- Died: July 8, 1982 (aged 82); Warsaw, Poland
- Occupations: Engineer, Instructor

Stanisław Panczakiewicz was a pioneering Polish car body designer and engineer.

== Career ==
Panczakiewicz attended Staszic junior high school in Warsaw. After the outbreak of World War I, he interrupted his studies in 1916 to join the Polish Legions in the Austro-Hungarian Empire. He served in the 5th Infantry Regiment of the 3rd Brigade of the Polish Legions. In 1917, due to the Oath crisis, he was interned together with his regiment in Zegrze near Warsaw. Thanks to the help from his family, he regained his freedom, but on condition that he joined the Central Committee of the Army as a one-year volunteer. Since his father was from the Austrian partition, Stanisław was granted Austro-Hungarian citizenship. In 1918 Panczakiewicz was sent to the infantry officer school in Opava. Before that, he filled the gap in his education by obtaining a secondary school leaving certificate in Kraków. He left officer school with the rank of ensign. After Poland declared independence, Stanisław joined the 5th Zaslaw Uhlan Regiment, with which he took part in the relief of Lviv and the fights against the Ukrainians near Kovel. During the Polish–Soviet War, Panczakiewicz was already a cadet officer and deputy commander of a motor column at the disposal of the 5th Army of under General Władysław Sikorski.

After the end of the war in 1922, he worked briefly as a draftsman in his father's architectural studio, but soon he went to study in Paris, where in 1926 he graduated from the Higher School of Aviation and Mechanical Structures (Ecole Supérieure d'Aéronautique et de Constructions Mécaniques) and the School of Engineering (École d'Ingénieurs Civiles) and several months of economic courses at the Higher School of Commerce (École des Hautes Études Commerciales). During his studies in 1924, he was a quality controller of the aviation equipment ordered by the army at the Polish Military Mission in Paris.

In 1927, Panczakiewicz started working at the Central Automotive Workshops (CWS), immediately as the head of the body shop, as its youngest employee. He designed the body of the first serially-built Polish passenger car, the CWS T-1. He created several body styles for the T-1, including the torpedo, carriage, berlina and faux-cabriolet body variants, as well as the development version of the CWS T-8 and the smaller T-2, as well as an ambulance, mail truck, and semi-truck based on the T-1 and the T-8.

In the years 1932–1933 he traveled around Western European countries, where he became acquainted with advancements in the field of coachwork construction. From 1934, he worked at the National Engineering Institute (PZInż), where he headed the bodywork department. Before the outbreak of World War II, he designed, among others, a tourist bus body on the Polski Fiat 621R chassis, the PZInż Zawrat, a streamline body for the PZInż 403 Lux-Sport, cabs for the PZInż 342 and PZInż 343 wheeled artillery tractors and trucks, including the driver's cabin of the 3.5-ton PZInż 713 truck. He cooperated in creating the body architecture of all types of Sokół motorcycles. He also developed the body of the CWS M111/Sokół 1000 sidecar.

After the outbreak of World War II, during the Invasion of Poland, he was evacuated with the crew and resources of PZInż to the eastern areas of the country. After the end of hostilities, he returned to the capital. During the German occupation, Stanisław ran a paper warehouse, thus avoiding work in the automotive industry for the Germans. He was active in the underground and was a soldier of the Kedyw with the rank of lieutenant under the pseudonym Bończa. During the Warsaw Uprising he was cut off from his parent unit and instead smuggled weapons to a local unit and also engaged in combat in Mokotów. After the fall of the uprising, he was held in a prisoner of war camp, but managed to escape from captivity.

On January 18, 1945, Panczakiewicz returned to Warsaw and co-organized the launch of the Hipolit Wawelberg and Stanisław Rotwand School of Machine Construction and Electrical Engineering (later part of the Warsaw University of Technology), where he also inaugurated the first series of lectures. After a short period of work in state institutions, at the beginning of 1947 he took up the position of head of the bodywork department at the Central Technical Bureau of the Automotive Industry (CBTPM), later renamed Centralne Biuro Konstrukcyjne No. 5 (CBK 5) and then - Bureau of Design of the Automotive Industry (BKPMot.). Stanisław held this position until 1968.

Panczakiewicz was the co-creator of the first post-war truck, the Star 20. The team of designers of the 3.5-ton truck was composed mostly of former employees of the PZInż Study Office, who in the 1930s participated in the work on the PZInż 703, 713 and 723 series of trucks. The author of the general concept, frame and suspension design was Mieczysław Dębicki. The drive transmission was created under the supervision of Jerzy Werner and the engine was created under the supervision of Jan Werner. The dyno and road tests were organized and directed by Aleksander Rummel. Panczakiewicz designed the N20 cabin and cargo box. The team of designers received the State Science Prize in 1950 for developing the car.

In the years 1947–1948, the WSK Mielec plant produced a Leyland LOPS3/1 bus based on the Leyland Motors frame and engine according to Panczakiewicz's design. From 1950, the Sanok Wagon Factory "Sanowag" also assembled a Fiat 666RN bus based on an Italian frame and engine, with a body produced on site. It was adapted by Panczakiewicz from the original design to the factory's capabilities. At the end of 1951, a prototype of the FSC Star Star N50 bus according to his design was built on a lowered and extended version of the Star 20 chassis . A year later, the production of the Star N52 bus began in "Sanowag", created as a result of refining the prototype version.

In 1954, Panczakiewicz joined the team led by Karol Pionnier, head of the Chief Designer Department at the Passenger Car Factory (FSO), which was to design a popular car. Early in the project that led to the design of the FSO Syrena. Two competing pre-prototypes with different styling and body structures were built. This resulted from a conflict within the team between Panczakiewicz, who had extensive pre-war experience in metal and wood structures, and a young engineer from FSO - Stanisław Łukaszewicz, versed in the design of the Warsaw car, calling for an all-metal body. The so-called Syrena II prepared in 1954 by Łukaszewicz used body elements from Warsaw and was technologically developed for large-scale production. Panczakiewicz's competing car had a body based on a wooden frame, covered with fiberboard panels and used fewer components from Warsaw, but was stylistically better. Pionnier reconciled engineers of two generations by choosing Panczakiewicz's styling and commissioning Łukaszewicz to develop its design using more modern technology.

The designer was also the author of the styling of the K26 cab of the Star 25 car prototype (1956), which, despite its modern styling, did not enter mass production and the body of the 48-seat Odra A81 bus (1957) based on the elongated and lowered frame and drive of the Żubr A80 car, which remained a prototype. He presented drawings of two of his own proposals for modernizing car bodies, in opposition to those by the Italian company Carrozzeria Ghia. In articles in the automotive press, he expressed surprise that the task of designing the new body of Warsaw was not entrusted to domestic designers, suggesting that he could take it on.

== Relatives and death ==
Stanisław was the son of Ludwik Panczakiewicz (1873–1935), a Warsaw architect and construction entrepreneur. He died suddenly on July 8, 1982, in Warsaw, and was buried at the Powązki Cemetery (plot 100-6-20/21).

CWS T-1	PZInż 403 Lux-Sport	PZInż 713 truck with wagon cab
Falcon 1000 M111 motorcycle with sidecar designed by Panczakiewicz	Star 20 truck	Bus with Leyland LOPS 3/1 chassis
Star N52 bus	FSO Syrena	Grave of Stanislaw Panczakiewicz at Powązki Cemetery
