= Szymel and Helena Wileński Tenement House =

Modernist tenement house in Łódź, Poland

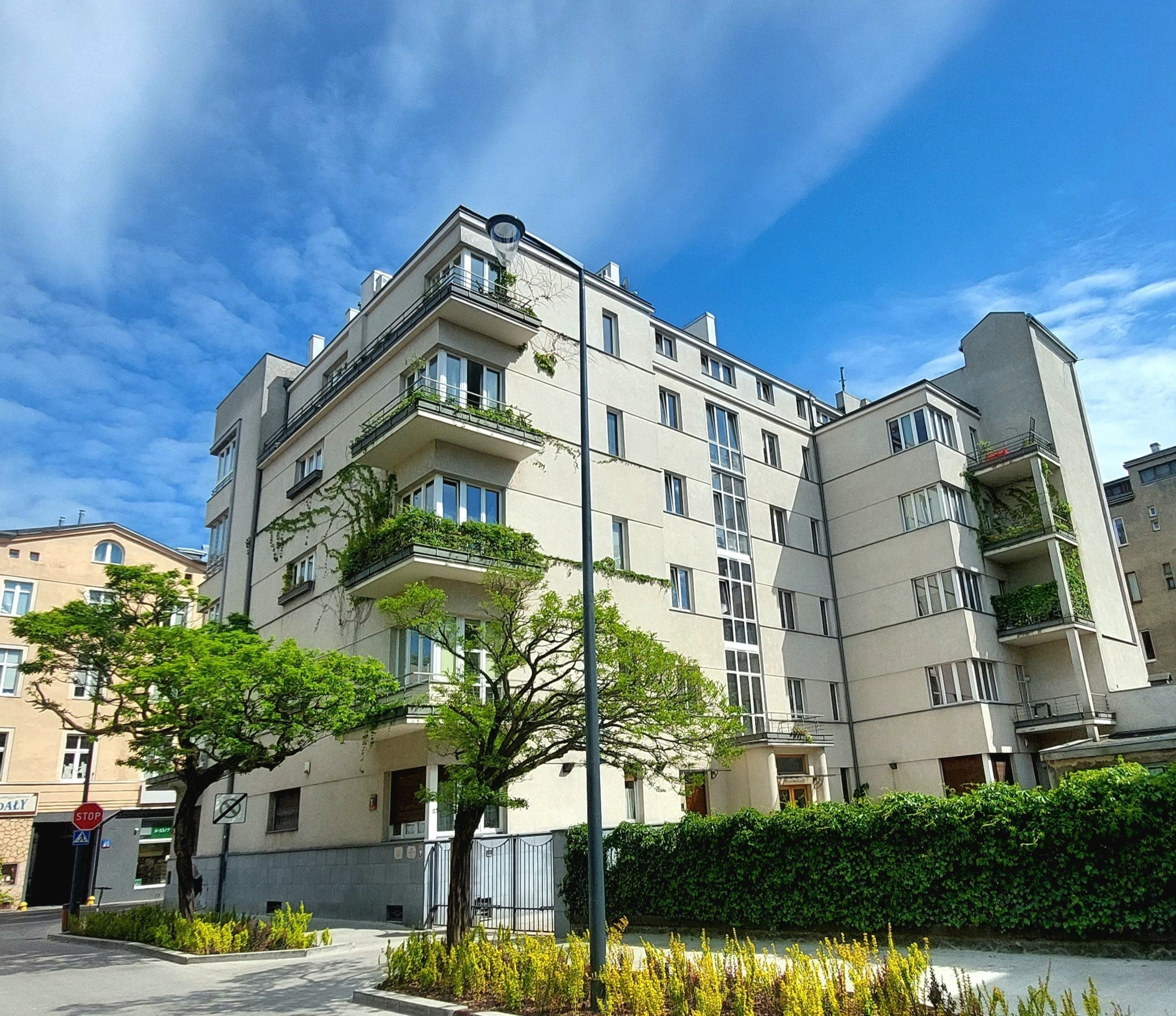
- The tenement house in May 2024

- Location within Poland

General information
- Architectural style: Modernism
- Location: Łódź, Poland, 1 Komuny Paryskiej Square
- Coordinates: 51°45′53.32″N 19°27′41.62″E
- Completed: 1938
- Client: Szymel Wileński and Helena Wileńska

Technical details
- Floor count: 5

Design and construction
- Architect: Henryk Lewinson

The Szymel and Helena Wileński Tenement House is a Modernist tenement house located at the corner of Henryk Sienkiewicz Street and Komuny Paryskiej Square in Łódź, Poland. Together with the nearby Mieczysław Neufeld Villa and Jakub Lando Townhouse, it forms a characteristic group of interwar luxury residential buildings in the Modernist style in Łódź.

== History ==
The building was designed in 1934 by Henryk Lewinson for Szymel and Helena Wileński. Construction was completed in 1938.

In 1932, the Wileński family still lived at 152 Piotrkowska Street, in a corner tenement house at the present-day junction with Piłsudskiego Avenue. They later moved to Komuny Paryskiej Square. According to the Łódź city address book for 1937–1939, the building was inhabited by engineer Jan Wileński and industrialist Stanisław Wileński, the owner of S. Wileński, Łódź Fabryka Filców, a felt-manufacturing company operating at 48 J. Długosza Street in Koziny.

After World War II, the building housed the local headquarters of the Polish Workers' Party, and subsequently of the Polish United Workers' Party. The apartment formerly occupied by the building's original owners was subsequently occupied by Ignacy Loga-Sowiński. In 1952, the party headquarters were moved to a newly constructed building on Kościuszko Avenue.

The large apartments, some covering several hundred square metres, were divided into smaller units, which were subsequently occupied by new residents. In the 1960s, the first floor was occupied by Jerzy Werner, one of the pioneers of the Polish automotive industry and rector of the Lodz University of Technology from 1962 to 1968. During the same period, the apartment formerly occupied by the Wileński family was occupied by Tadeusz Pawlikowski, rector of the Medical University of Łódź from 1968 to 1972.

In 2013, the building underwent a major renovation financed by the condominium association.

According to Order No. 772/2023 of the Mayor of Łódź, issued on 6 April 2023, the building is included in the Municipal Register of Monuments (Gminna Ewidencja Zabytków) under number 377.

== Architecture ==
At the time of its construction, the tenement house was a luxury residential building. It was connected to the sewerage system and supplied with running water and gas, while lifts were available to its residents. The apartments measured approximately 150 square metres.

The corner section of the building was designed as a projecting, elevated tower, with fully glazed corners on the individual floors. At the level of the fourth floor, narrow terraces extend along both elevations. The corner facing Komuny Paryskiej Square features angled balconies with openwork metal balustrades.

Inside the building, a service staircase was provided alongside the main staircase and lift. This was an unusual solution in Modernist architecture, which sought to move away from emphasizing social stratification. The service staircase was connected to the apartments on both sides of the main staircase by a narrow passage running between two glazed walls of the main staircase.
