= Smart Cities EMC Network for Training =

Higher education

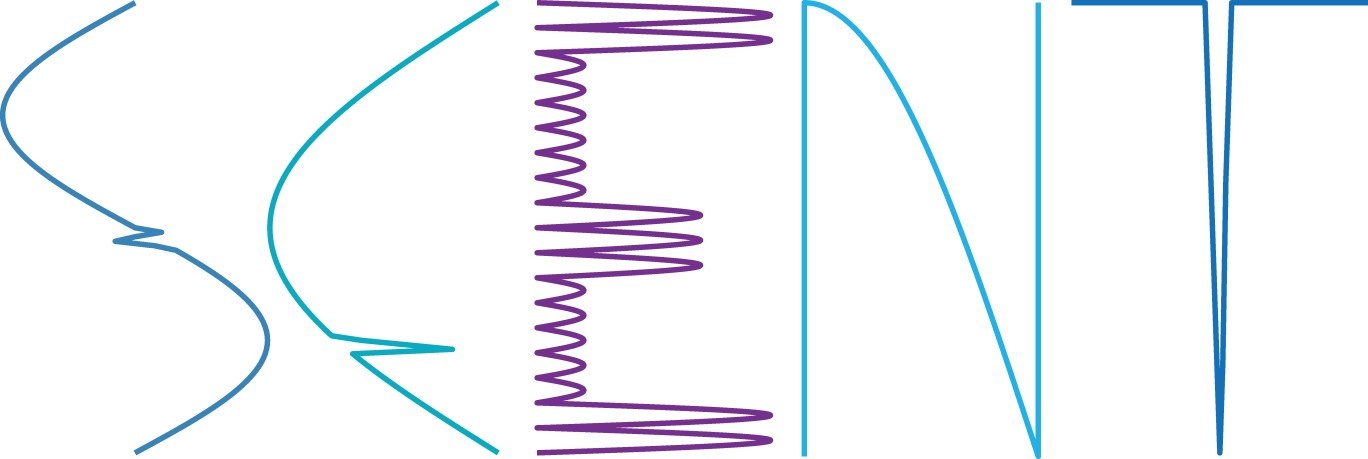
- Founder: European Union’s Horizon 2020
- Website: www.scent-itn.org/index.html

The Smart Cities EMC Network for Training (SCENT) is a project funded by the European Union's Horizon 2020 research program under the Marie Skłodowska-Curie grant agreement No 812391. It is a Ph.D training network program in the field of Electromagnetic Compatibility (EMC) especially in the smart cities application. Three universities (the University of Twente, the University of Nottingham, the University of Zielona Góra) and twelve industries collaborate in SCENT project. Supported by the IEEE EMC Society Technical Committee 7: ("Low-Frequency EMC") besides Ph.D training program, SCENT project also performs scientific training programs and social outreach programs.

== History ==
The initiative began in 2018 with the aim of finding solutions to power quality (PQ) problems arising from conducted electromagnetic interference (EMI) from integrated electrical power system equipment that are becoming smart (Smart Cities). The European Union started SCENT project at 1 September 2018 as part of the H2020-EU. 1.3.1 under ITN scheme. The H2020-EU.1.3.1 is an EU collaborative program to foster new skills by means of initial training of researchers. The CORDIS EU commission stated, as the part of Horizon 2020 program, the SCENT project is designated to support the optimization of power distribution networks inside buildings and industrial plants and transport networks with respect to compatibility (no interference) and efficiency. The SCENT project implement in 4 years and end on 31 August 2022.

== Objectives ==
The SCENT project was established to carry out doctorate training, scientific training, and social activities in collaboration with universities, research institutions, and non-academic organisations.

In order to achieve this general objective, the SCENT project divides their work into several detailed projects called Work Packages.

=== Management ===
Objective: Efficient project execution, including finance, reporting and maintaining the relationship between the SCENT stakeholders.

=== Training ===
Objective: Create a European Doctoral/Graduate School for EMC, especially on conducted emissions, susceptibility and harmonics.

=== Dissemination and exploration ===
Objective: Disseminate the SCENT's findings to the European academic, educational, industrial, and public groups. Integrate the SCENT doctoral program into established graduate programs.

=== Outreach ===
Objective: Disseminate the SCENT's findings to the public.

=== Behavioral modelling and simulation of connected devices ===
Objective: Developed new models and simulated several load conditions connected to grids.

=== Statistical and probabilistic modelling and simulation ===
Objective: Develop validated models and simulations of power distribution grids for EMC and power quality assessment.

=== Measurement and monitoring, experimental evaluation of equipment and network ===
Objective: To characterize and evaluate the distribution network and its interconnected equipment with experiment or measurement.

=== System topology and interaction, compensation and corrective ===
Objective: To provide a verified set of tools and determine the risk of electromagnetic interference in complex systems by employing statistical approach.

== Activities ==
All of the SCENT activities are the result of collaboration between the University of Twente (UT), the University of Zielona Gora (UZ) the University of Nottingham (UN) and industries. Based on MSCA-ITN-EJD-European Join Doctoral scheme each Early Stage Researcher (ESR) of SCENT must study and take courses at these three Universities. Besides academic activities, the SCENT also involves in several activities including the ICT COST Action in Prague in 2019, the APEMC in Sapporo Japan in 2019, the EMC Europe in Barcelona Spain in 2019, Summer School at University of Twente in 2019, SENE conference in Łódź in 2019, APEMC in Sydney Australia in 2020, ETOPIA Workshop in 2020, IEEE EMC+SIPI virtual conference in 2020, ENEA workshop in Poland in 2020, IEEE EMC+SIPI in Glasgow in 2021, SCENT Summer School II in Zielona Gora Poland in 2021, ETOPIA Summer School II in Politechnico di Milan Italy in 2021, APEMC Bali in Indonesia in 2021 and Girls Day at University of Twente in 2022 as an outreach activity.

== Partners ==
European Union

Universities

- The University of Twente
- The University of Nottingham
- The University of Zielona Góra

Industries

- Siemens Motion Control
- Ursus
- Lambda Engineering
- Eko Energetyka
- Thales
- Enea Operator
- Network Rail
- Solaris
- RH Marine
- Atkins
- Tauron
- Jaguar Land Rover

Other partners

- IEEE EMC Society, Technical Committee (TC7)
- Nederlandse EMC-ESD Vereniging (EMC-ESD)
