= C4P =

Polish half-track truck family

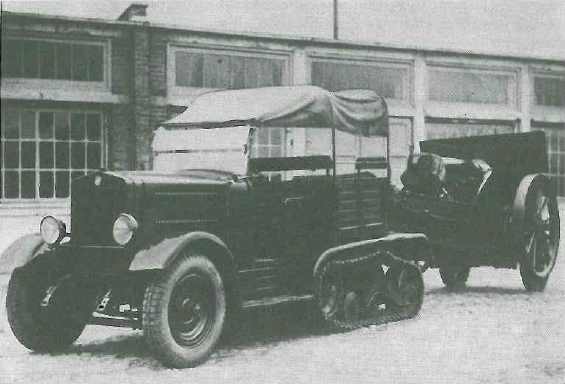
- Type: Artillery tractor
- Place of origin: Poland

Service history
- In service: 1935-1939
- Used by: Poland
- Wars: World War II

Production history
- Designed: 1935
- Produced: 1935-1938
- No. built: 400

Specifications
- Mass: 3 tonnes
- Length: 4,7 m
- Width: 1,9 m
- Height: 2,35 m
- Crew: 2
- Passengers: 4
- Engine: V6 3L FIAT-122B (PZInż. 367)
- Operational range: 250 km
- Maximum speed: 35 km/h

Samochód półgąsienicowy wz. 34 (literally "Half-track car, year 1934 model") was a Polish halftrack lorry. It was produced in a variety of variants, the best-known of them being the C4P artillery tractor used by the Polish Army in the period before World War II.

The vehicle was based on a 2.5 tonne Fiat 621 truck, licence-built by Polski Fiat in Poland at the time. In 1934 Edward Habich of the Bureau for Technical Studies of the Armoured Arms (BBT BP) designed a half-track version of the Fiat 621 lorry, initially dubbed the Mark 1934 halftrack cargo lorry (Polish: Półgąsienicowy samochód ciężarowy wz. 34).

Both Fiat 621 and wz. 34 shared the majority of parts, notably the slightly modified frame, the engine and the crew compartment. There were many notable differences as well though. The front axle was reinforced, a reduction drive was added and the gearbox was modified to better suit the new vehicle. Most notably, the rear axles were replaced with a continuous track system modelled after the Vickers E tank and French Citroën-Kégresse tracks. Heaviest towed pieces were 3143 kg 120 mm wz.1878/09/31 guns.

The vehicle entered production at the PZInż Czechowice factory in 1935 and the production run lasted until 1938. Altogether some 400 were built in all variants, including roughly 80 artillery tractors.

== Variants ==
The wz. 34 / C4P was delivered in at least 8 different variants:

C4P for heavy artillery
Intended for 120 mm wz.1878/09/31 guns (experimentally also for 155 mm howitzers and 105 mm wz.29 Schneider guns). Their frame was slightly shorter and was equipped with a special catch for the gun carriage. Initially the crew compartment was open-topped and covered only with a tarpaulin roof, later production models had a compartment enclosed in a steel and wooden box. Both variants had a bench for four artillerymen just behind the driver's compartment.

C4P for light artillery
Intended for 75 mm Schneider guns and 100 mm Škoda howitzers, as well as for transporting ammo and towing caissons. They were basically identical to the later heavy artillery variant, except that the cargo hold was equipped with two benches for three soldiers each.

C4P for anti-aircraft artillery
Intended as the basic tractor for Polish 75 mm wz.36 Star AA guns. They had a lengthened cargo hold with two benches for two soldiers each.

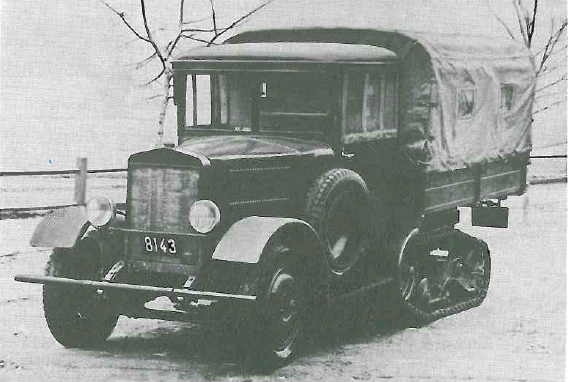
Basic half-track version

Samochód ciężarowy wz. 34 ("cargo car, Mark 1934")
Had a long frame and long cargo hold.

Samochód warsztatowy wz. 34 ("workshop car, Mark 1934")
Had an open steel chassis with a tarpaulin roof and sides of the crew compartment. The sides were equipped with hinges and could be opened separately to allow for easier access to workshop equipment. In addition to their primary usage, similar cars were also used to tow anti-air searchlights.

Ambulans wz.34 (ambulance)
Had an enclosed box compartment in the rear with space for up to eight seated soldiers (or four on stretchers). Approximately 50 lorries of this variant were built.

Wóz strażacki wz.34 (fire engine)
A couple were built for the municipal fire brigades of Lwów

"lot"
Designated as either C4P "lot" or Samochód wz. 34 "lot", this variant was basically a typical wz. 34 cargo car, with a shortened frame and equipment for towing aeroplanes at the airfields.

== See also ==
- AMC Schneider P 16
- Kégresse track
