= Mieczysław Dębicki =

Polish professor of mechanical engineer

Mieczysław Dębicki (January 1, 1905 - June 21, 1977) was a Polish professor of mechanical engineer and a car designer. He served as the Dean of the Faculty of Mechanical Engineering and as the Vice-Rector for Science at Gdańsk University of Technology.

== Early life and education ==
Dębicki was born on January 1, 1905, in Warsaw, to the poet and journalist Zdzisław Dębicki and Zofia (née Wierzbicka). He graduated from the Faculty of Mechanical Engineering at the Maritime School in Tczew, in 1924.

After graduating, he took an apprenticeship as a ship's mechanic's assistant North-Atlantic line of the Danish Shipbuilding Company "Det Ostasiatyske Co". A year later, Mieczysław was admitted to the School of Mechanical Engineering of the Warsaw University of Technology, but he interrupted his studies in 1928 to return to merchant ships, this time in the French shipbuilding company "Chargeurs Rennis". In the years 1929-1932 he continued his mechanical studies, this time at the Lviv University of Technology where he graduated with a diploma in mechanical engineering with distinction.

== Career ==
After graduation, Dębicki worked as a deputy manager of car workshops, then moved to the Technical Office of the Škoda Works aircraft engine factory. From 1934 until the outbreak of World War II, he worked as a designer at the Study Office of the State Engineering Institute in Warsaw on several projects, including the PZInż 703. In 1936 he began lecturing at the State Aviation and Automotive Technical School.

During the war, he was involved in small-scale trade and production, and was also a member of the Kedyw, where he was responsible for automotive matters such as transporting supplies and ammunition, as well as providing driving lessons.

After the liberation of Poland, he worked in state-owned plants and was responsible for their organization. At the same time, he was employed at the Gdańsk University of Technology, where he organized the Department of Mechanical Vehicle Construction at the Faculty of Mechanical Engineering in April, 1945. Dębicki became an associate professor in 1949, and was promoted to a regular professor in 1962. He served as the Dean of the Faculty of Mechanical Engineering from 1951 to 1954 and as the Vice-Rector for Science from 1956 to 1959. During this time, several projects were undertaken under his supervision. This includes his work alongside Stanisław Panczakiewicz, Jerzy Werner, and Jan Werner on the FSC Star Star 20, which was based on the PZInż 713. Mieczysław published 24 articles and an academic textbook titled "Car Theory: Theory of Movement".

== Personal life ==
Mieczysław married Stanisława Szalitówna in 1938. They had two children, Piotr (born in 1941) and Joanna (born in 1944).

== Death ==
Mieczysław Dębicki died on June 21, 1977, in Gdańsk. He was buried at the Srebrzysko Cemetery in Gdańsk (area IX, professors' quarters, row 2, grave 33).

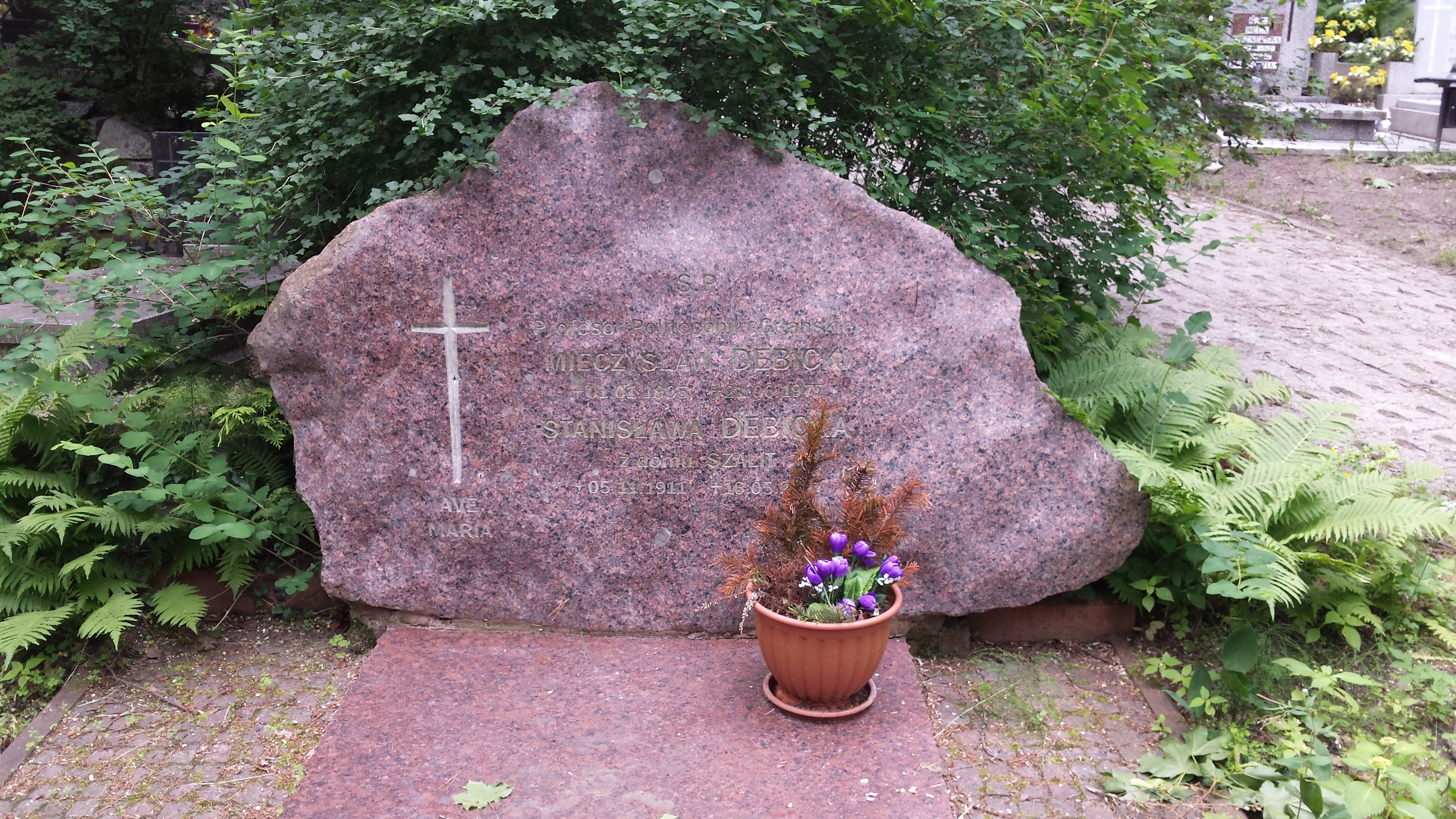
The grave of Professor Mieczysław Dębicki at the Srebrzysko Cemetery in Gdańsk
