= Uzel Holding =

Turkish industrial manufacturing company (1937-2012)

- Type: Private
- Industry: Agricultural machinery, automotive, parts and venture capital
- Founded: 1937
- Defunct: 2012
- Headquarters: Amsterdam, The Netherlands

Uzel Holding (also known as Uzel Group and Uzel Corporation) was one of Turkey's oldest and largest manufacturing companies. Its main sector was agricultural machinery, although it eventually branched out into the automotive industry and real estate through its venture capital arm, Argentum. The company was founded in 1937. However, its roots went back to the middle of the nineteenth century. Uzel Holding collapsed in 2010 and was declared bankrupt in July 2012.

== History ==
The roots of Uzel Group reach back to 1864 when the Uzel family began making and selling phaetons in the city of Rousse in Bulgaria, which was then part of the Ottoman Empire. Ibrahim Uzel, became the founder and the first Chairman of the Uzel Group in 1937 when he set up a sole proprietorship in Bursa, a city in northwestern Turkey and began making leaf springs for motor vehicles. In 1961, production of the company's first agricultural tractors began. The Company built its first diesel engine in 1964.

In 1997, 15% of the shares of a subsidiary of the Group, Uzel Makina, were listed both in Istanbul and London Stock Exchanges in an IPO coordinated by Morgan Stanley. In 2005, Uzel relocated its headquarters to Amsterdam in the Netherlands and acquired Gebrüder Holder GmbH, one of Europe's oldest tractor makers.

Argentum, the venture capital arm of Uzel, acquired the Century 21 master franchise license from Realogy for Germany, Croatia, Slovakia, Slovenia, Bosnia and Herzegovina, Serbia, Montenegro, Azerbaijan and Hungary in 2006.

By 2006, the Group had expanded its products and operations to over 75 countries and operating in a few different industries and embarked on so a major reorganisation. The Group was divided into three strategic business units: Agri (tractors, combines, cotton harvesters, sprayers, implements), Auto (engines, suspension systems, auto parts, defence systems, motorcycles, leaf springs) and Argentum (real estate, hospitality, franchising, technology).

In 2007, Uzel bought 51% of the Ursus Tractor Factory, manufacturer of the Ursus brand of tractors, and a former Massey Ferguson licensee. At that time, Uzel was now one of ten largest tractor companies in the world with six manufacturing facilities and three major brands and was given the Palladium Balanced Scorecard Hall of Fame Award. Uzel was the first company in the agricultural machinery sector to receive this award and the first company with Turkish origins.

In January 2009, Uzel's creditors reported problems with the company's payments. According to Hürriyet: "The quarrel in the [Uzel] family over fraud and breaches of confidence" was having "a negative impact on the financial and stock performance of the firm, which was once among the world's top 10 in agricultural machinery production". By 2010, Uzel had gone through a major re-structuring and had given up its Holder and Ursus brands. Uzel Holding collapsed in 2011 and in July 2012 was declared bankrupt.

== Former business units ==
Uzel Agri

- Tractors
- Combines
- Cotton harvesters
- Sprayers
- Implements

Uzel Auto

- Diesel engines
- Leaf springs
- Suspension systems
- Auto parts
- Defence systems

Argentum

- Real Estate
- Technology: VidZone Digital Media
- Franchising: Century21 Turkey, Century21 Eurasia
- Hospitality: The Pucic Palace Dubrovnik, L'Ambiance Hotel, Bodrum
