= Mieczysław Neufeld Villa =

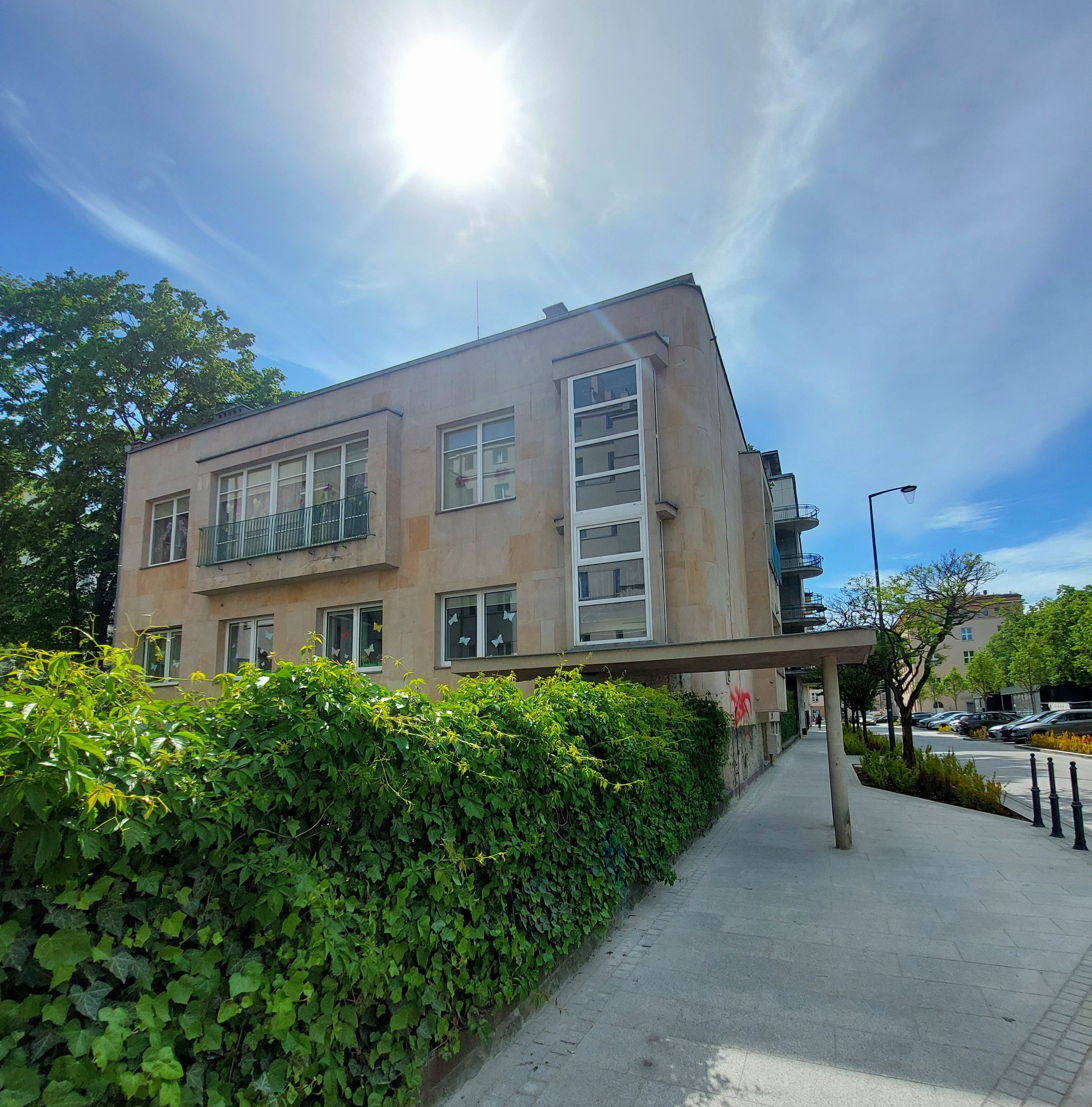
- The villa in May 2024, including its distinctive canopy
- Interactive map of the Mieczysław Neufeld Villa area

General information
- Architectural style: Modernist functionalism
- Location: Łódź, Poland, 2 Komuny Paryskiej Square
- Coordinates: 51°45′53.32″N 19°27′39.67″E
- Current tenants: Municipal Kindergarten No. 58
- Completed: 1938
- Client: Mieczysław Neufeld
- Owner: City of Łódź

Technical details
- Floor count: 2 above ground, plus attic and basement

Design and construction
- Architects: Jerzy Berliner; Mieczysław Łęczycki

The Mieczysław Neufeld Villa is a villa in the Functionalist branch of modernist architecture, located at 2 Komuny Paryskiej Square in Łódź, Poland. Together with the neighbouring Szymel and Szymel and Helena Wileński Tenement House and the Jakub Lando Townhouse, it forms a distinctive group of luxurious pre-war modernist buildings from the interwar period in Łódź.

== History ==
The building was designed by Jerzy Berliner and Mieczysław Łęczycki on commission from Mieczysław Neufeld. Construction began in 1937 and was completed the following year. The villa was originally designed for two families, probably a father and his son.

The building currently houses Municipal Kindergarten No. 58 and serves as the main seat of Municipal Kindergarten Complex No. 1 in Łódź.

Under Order No. 772/2023 of the Mayor of Łódź, issued on 6 April 2023, the building is included in the Municipal Heritage Record (Gminna Ewidencja Zabytków) of Łódź under number 378.

== Architecture ==
The villa stands between the luxurious modernist Szymel and Helena Wileński Tenement House at 1 Komuny Paryskiej Square and the Jakub Lando Urban Tenement House at 3 Komuny Paryskiej Square.

It is a two-storey villa on a rectangular plan, located on the southern frontage of Komuny Paryskiej Square, with its main axis arranged transversely to the street. The building consists of two above-ground storeys, a partially usable attic and a basement. It has a flat roof with a parapet wall and a cornice.

With the exception of the northern elevation, the façades are asymmetrically composed. The building is faced with rectangular sandstone slabs: hammer-finished at the base and polished on the upper sections. The façades are articulated by a fully glazed bay window on the first floor of the eastern elevation and by a terrace at ground-floor level. On the western side, the building has another bay window with a large window and a balcony.

The staircases are located in opposite corners of the building: the representative staircase in the north-eastern corner and the service staircase in the south-western corner. The main entrance is located on the northern axis of the eastern elevation and is sheltered by a canopy formed by a curved reinforced concrete slab supported on slender round columns. Above it is a two-storey stairwell window filled with glass bricks.

The villa was originally divided into two spacious multi-room apartments with similar layouts, one on the ground floor and one on the first floor. The ground-floor apartment had a garden terrace and a bay window facing the square. The first-floor apartment featured shallow bay windows facing the courtyard and garden, as well as a balcony on the western side.

The villa occupies a deep rectangular plot enclosed on the side facing the square by a fence consisting of openwork steel panels set on a masonry base. The fence has a pedestrian gate and a vehicular entrance leading to the eastern courtyard, which is connected to the courtyard of the neighbouring corner tenement house.
