= Ursus A =

Family of Polish lorries and buses

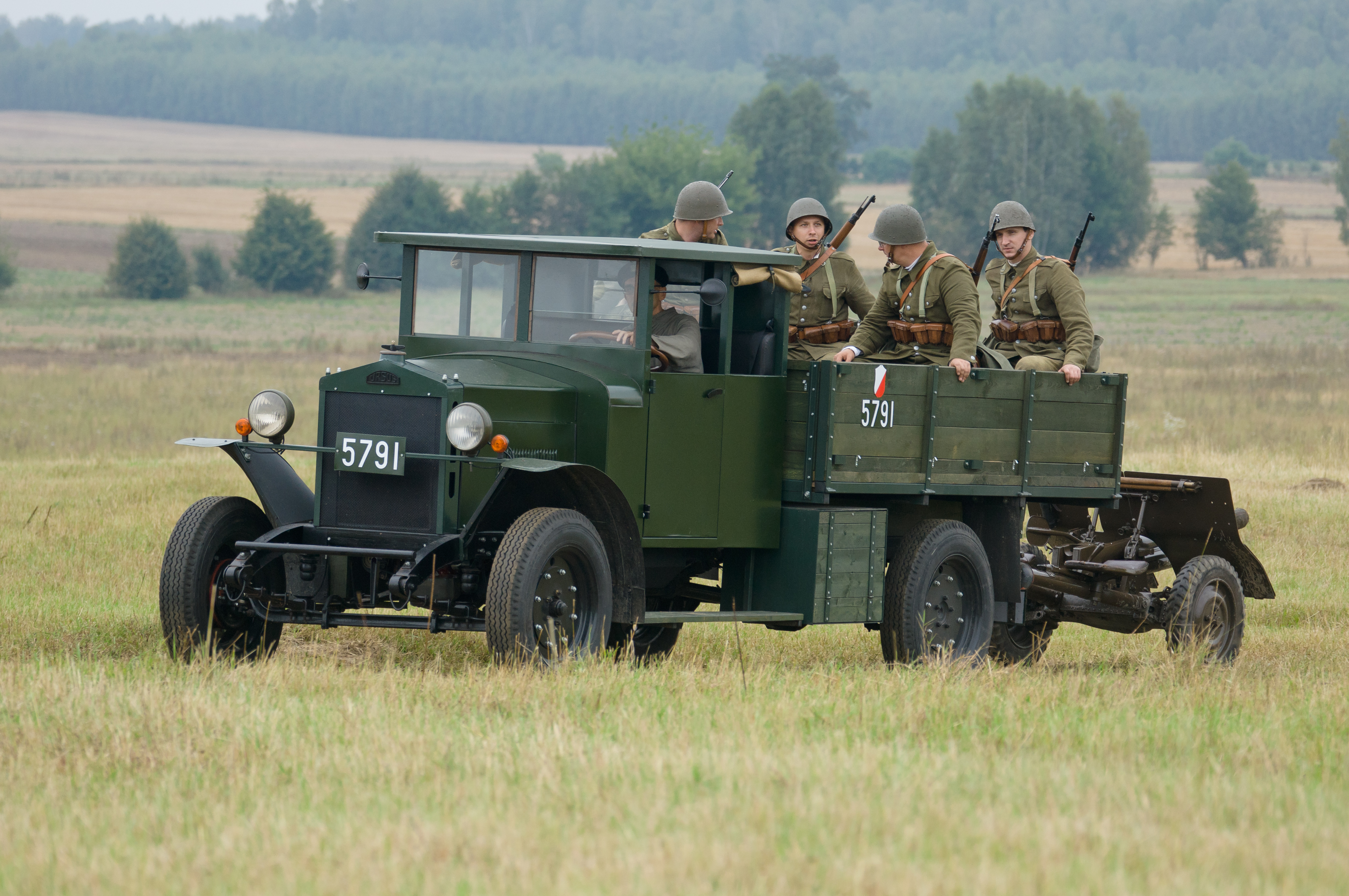
- A replica of Ursus A in basic lorry variant.

Overview
- Manufacturer: Ursus SA
- Production: 1928–1931

Body and chassis
- Class: Truck

Powertrain
- Transmission: 4-speed manual

Dimensions
- Length: 5115 mm
- Width: 2000 mm
- Height: 2500 mm
- Curb weight: 1540 kg

Ursus A was a series of Polish lorries and buses produced by Ursus. It was a license-built modification of the Italian SPA 25C Polonia trucks.

In 1924 the Polish government ordered a large series of license-built, 3-ton Berliet CBA lorries and 1.5-ton SPA 25C Polonia trucks. Ursus was to deliver 1050 trucks in three batches of 200 Berliets and 150 SPAs each. The first batch was to be imported from France and Italy, the second locally assembled from imported parts, while the final batch was to be produced locally in Poland. The company started building a new factory in Czechowice near Warsaw to accommodate the new production lines, but construction was slow. Eventually, the Polish Army agreed to buy 400 Berliets from France and allowed the Ursus company to focus on SPA production. On 11 July 1928 the first 52 Ursus A trucks left the factory.

Ursus A was basically a modification of the Italian truck, adapted to harsh Polish weather and poor roads. Initially modifications were minor, the basic difference was a larger payload (2.5 tons instead of 2) and a simplified cooler. Over time, additional modifications were made (notably three types of cabs), which led to a range of variants being produced. The earliest variant had an open cab, with a folding canvas top, quickly replaced with a cab with a fixed roof and open side windows. The final variant featured a closed cab. Until 1931, when production was phased out in favour of Polski Fiat 621, 884 vehicles were delivered, including 509 for the civilian market.

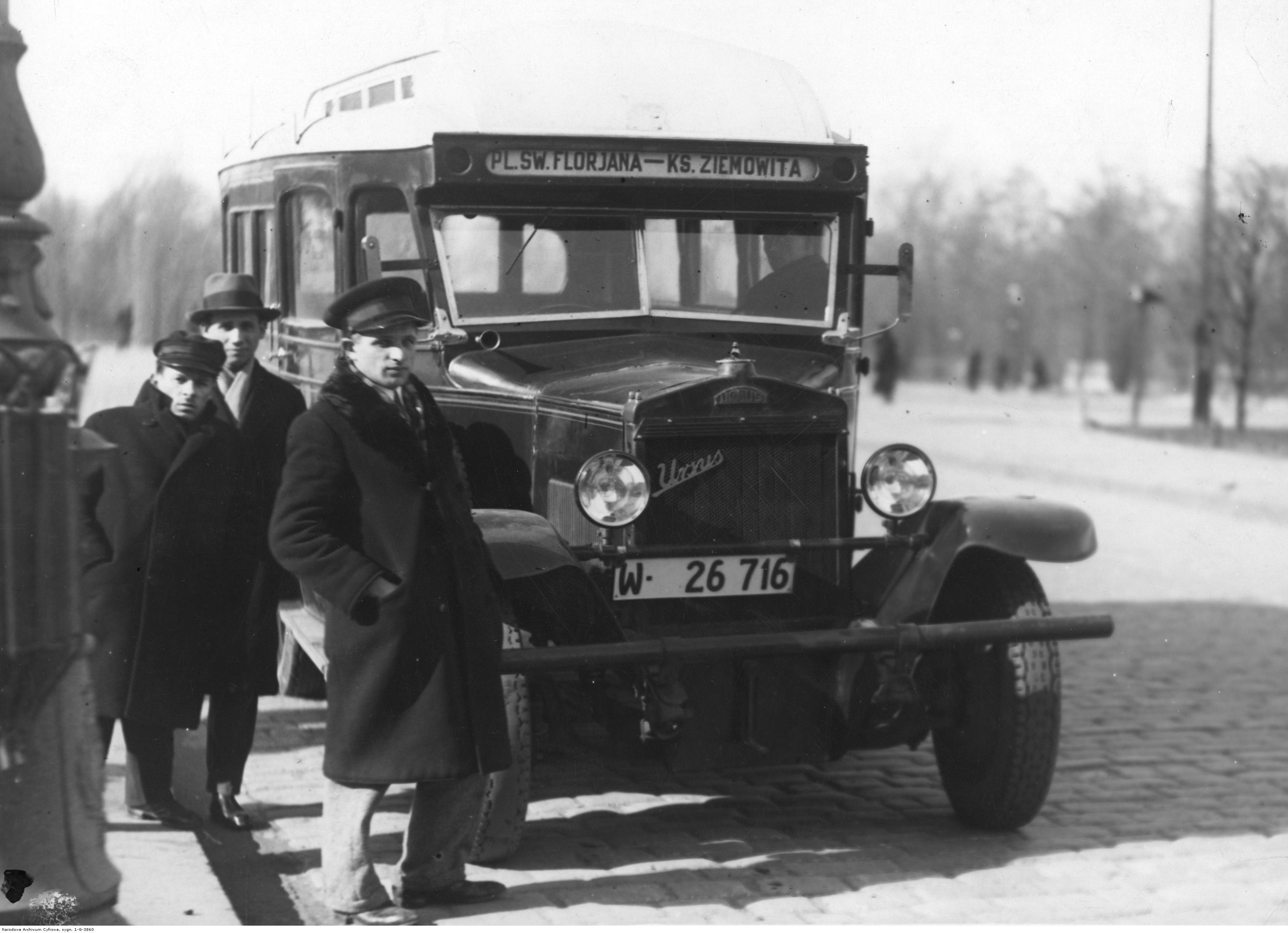
Bus based on Ursus AW undercarriage

== Variants ==
Ursus A
Basic type, undercarriage and cab only
Ursus A30
Modernised undercarriage
Ursus AW
Lengthened frame adapted to up to 3 tonnes of payload, mostly used for bus construction
Ursus AT 3
All-terrain version with three axles (prototype)
Samochód pancerny wz. 29
Armoured car on Ursus A chassis.

== See also ==
- Ursus Factory
- Polski Fiat 621
