= Pol-Mot Holding =

Polish holding company

Pol-Mot Holding SA
- Company type: Holding company
- Industry: automotive industry, agricultural machine
- Founded: Warsaw, Poland (1968)
- Headquarters: Warsaw, Poland
- Website: polmot.pl

Pol-Mot Holding SA is a Polish holding company based manufacturer of agricultural equipment. Pol-Mot was established in 1968; it controlled the whole international trade and collaboration of Polish automotive industry, inclusive with license contracts.

Between 1990 and 1996 it was privatized and diversified its activity, which now includes manufacture of automotive components, tractors and agricultural machines, construction, and – traditionally – sales of cars.

The 14 daughter companies in their majority were either acquired or specially established. Among them are five car dealers (makes: Fiat, Iveco, Piaggio, Skoda, MG, Rover), five agricultural machinery factories cooperating with Indian Escorts, Swedish Alfa-Laval Agri, Dutch Netagco, and two automotive components factories (mechanical carjacks, electrical harnesses, brake & washer fluid reservoirs).

Pol-Mot has also acquired some real estate in cooperation with different partners.

== Parent companies ==
- automotive industry:
  - Ital-Mot
  - Viamot
  - Pol-Mot Auto
- agricultural machines:
  - URSUS (formerly Pol-Mot Warfama)
- renewable energy:
  - Invest-Mot
- hotels:
  - Pol-Mot Lovran (Croatia)
- real estate:
  - Belvedere Marki
