= Paris Commune Square, Łódź =

Square in Łódź, Poland

Paris Commune Square
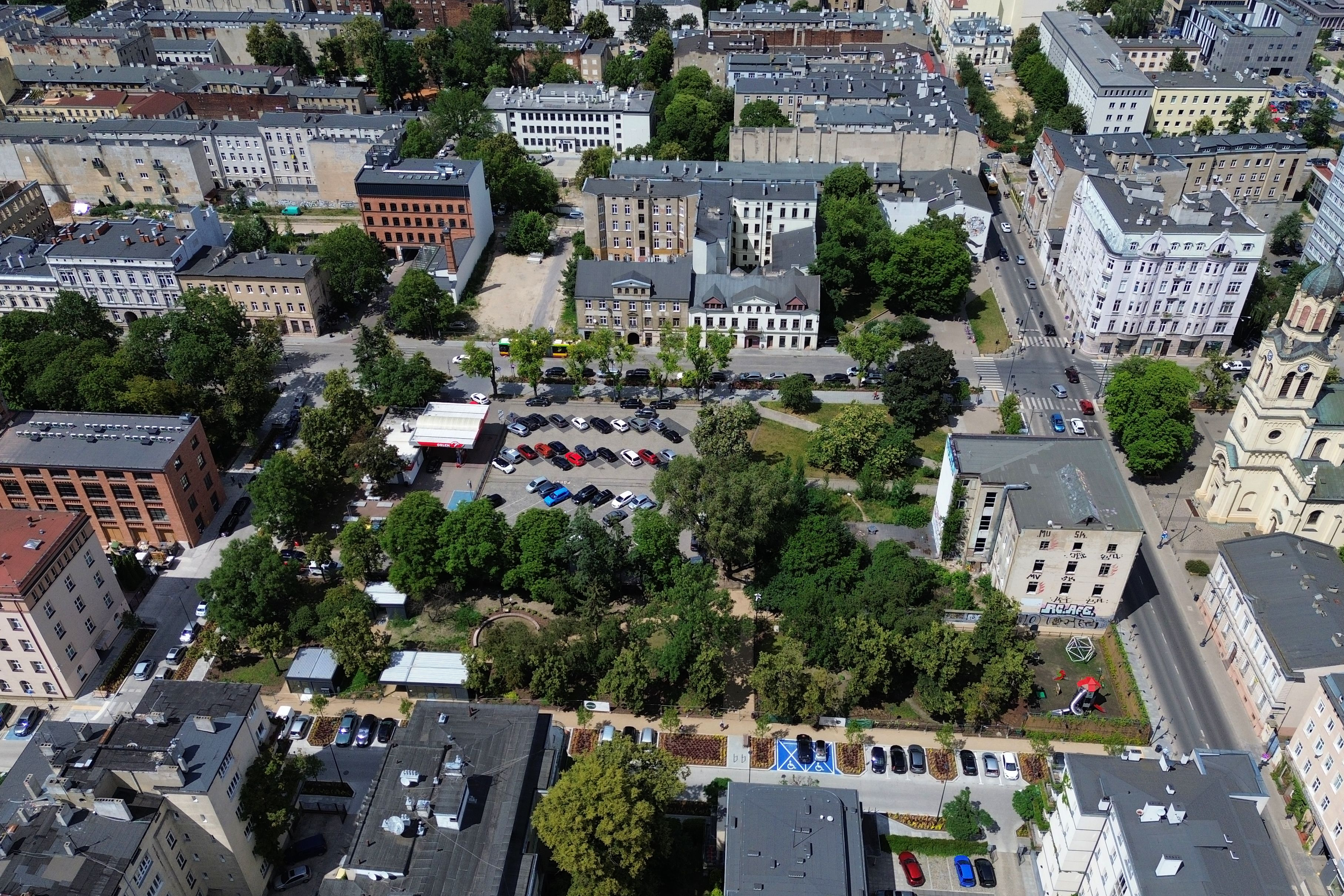
- Birdseye view of the Square, 2024

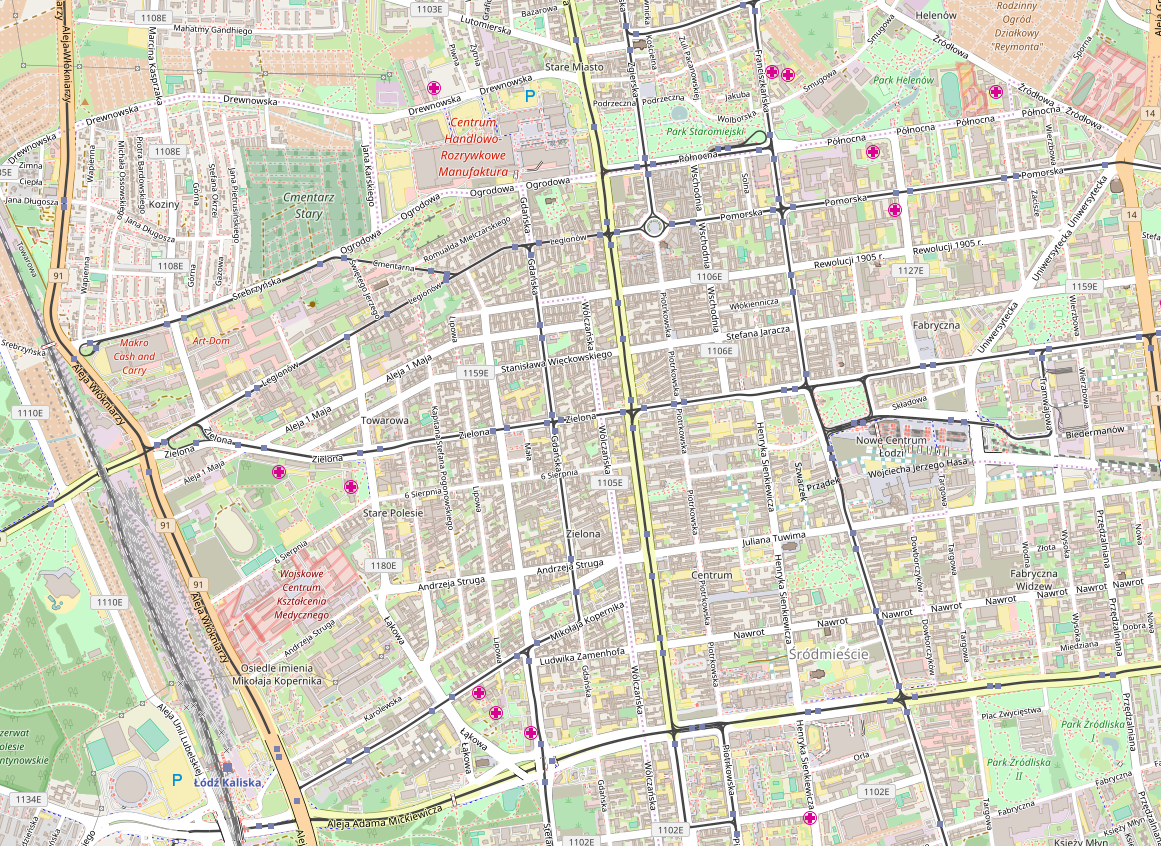
- Location within the city of Łódź
- Native name: Plac Komuny Paryskiej (Polish)
- Namesake: Paris Commune
- Location: Łódź, Poland
- Coordinates: 51.76496417619255°N 19.461037509916096°E

Paris Commune Square (Polish: Plac Komuny Paryskiej) is a square in Łódź, Poland, located in the Śródmieście district of the city.

== Layout ==
The square is located at the south-western corner of the intersection of Julian Tuwim Street and Henryk Sienkiewicz Street. To the south, the square connects with Schiller Passage.

== History ==
The plot on which the northern part of the square, including the present-day parking area, was built was owned for most of the 19th century by the Guild of Weaving Masters. It extended from Piotrkowska Street and remained undeveloped for a considerable period of time. Various recreational activities and ice skating took place there.

In the 1850s, the second Catholic church in Łódź and the city's first brick-built Catholic church, the Church of the Exaltation of the Holy Cross, was built at the south-eastern corner of what is now the intersection. In the following decade, plans were made to construct a building for what was intended to become the city's first institution of higher education, a polytechnic institute, on Majstrów Tkackich Square, but the project was never realised. At the same time, the creation of a large square on the site was considered.

The idea was revived during the interwar period. The square was eventually created on land taken over by the city in settlement of debts from the bankrupt Heinzel industrialist family. Its southern frontage was laid out along a newly established short street, which at the time was named Nowo-Świętokrzyska Street. Initially, the square had no official name and was commonly referred to as the square by Świętokrzyska Street.

Three Modernist tenement buildings and a substantial villa were erected along the street in the second half of the 1930s. The last of these, at number 4, was not finally plastered until the 1970s.

The square acquired its present form in the early 1950s, when a parking area and a petrol station were established on the former grounds of the German sports club "Union-Touring", forming the northern part of the present square. A green area was created on the southern part of the open land. The traditional 19th-century layout, with a large internal courtyard, was nevertheless retained.

The area was redeveloped and renamed Paris Commune Square on the 80th anniversary year of the events in Paris in 1871. The renaming also resulted in the disappearance of the name of the former southern frontage street, Świętokrzyska Street.

These changes were connected with the development of a centre of municipal administration in the area. The city authorities established their seat at the Juliusz Heinzl Palace at 104 Piotrkowska Street. The palace was integrated with former factory buildings which were adapted for offices and a meeting hall for the then Municipal National Council. The factory outbuildings, which had previously housed, among other things, a weaving mill, were demolished or substantially altered, and their façades were unified and given a plain appearance largely devoid of decorative details. They adjoin Komuny Paryskiej Square on its western side, where a large parking area is also located. The reconstruction was designed by Ignacy (Izaak) Gutman.

The former factory buildings at the rear of the palace complex were converted into offices, including a meeting hall of the then Municipal National Council. In this configuration, the square was situated behind the complex.

The Juliusz Heinzl Palace, together with the adjoining buildings, continues to serve as the seat of Łódź's legislative and executive authorities.

=== Contemporary period ===
During the 1990s and the first decade of the 21st century, a low stone wall next to the petrol station became one of the characteristic features of the square. It served as a meeting place in the evenings, where people consumed alcohol.

In 2006, a fountain was constructed on a small green area between Paris Commune Square and Tuwim Street. In the same year, Łódź City Council named the green area Skwer Powstania Węgierskiego 1956 roku (transl. 1956 Hungarian Uprising Square) to commemorate the Hungarian Revolution of 1956.

In April 2014, councillors from Law and Justice proposed renaming Paris Commune Square after Lech Kaczyński and erecting a monument to him in its south-western section. The proposal met with strong opposition from many residents of Łódź and also prompted several protest performances. Among them was the placing of a sign reading Plac Boba Marleya (transl. Bob Marley Square) on a prematurely installed sign bearing the proposed new name, using the same colour and typeface. Ultimately, the name was not changed.

In 2018, the green area adjoining the petrol station was named Witcher Square (Skwer Wiedźmina) by a decision of the Łódź City Council. The name was intended to commemorate the 70th birthday of writer Andrzej Sapkowski, who has been an honorary citizen of Łódź since 2008.

Between April and June 2024, the square underwent revitalisation. The road surface was changed from asphalt to paving, and flowers, trees and other shrubs were planted. A water connection was also installed to provide irrigation for the green areas.

A fenced playground was created in the green area, equipped with a dragon-shaped slide, spring riders, a swing and a large climbing structure. Three small pavilions were also erected, intended to accommodate, among other facilities, a small food outlet, tourist information and a public toilet.

The area around the square was also to be illuminated, with additional lighting for the trees and illumination of the pavilions.

The total cost of the renovation was approximately PLN 7 million.

== Notable buildings and features ==
=== Modernist building complex ===
The square is adjacent to a group of three Modernist buildings that represent the high-standard residential architecture of late-1930s Łódź. The group consists of two tenement buildings and a villa situated on a quiet street in the city centre, opposite a landscaped green area, now Witcher Square, with a petrol station and parking area beyond it.

The outbreak of the Second World War interrupted the construction of a fourth building in the complex, a tenement house designed for engineer Tworek at 8 Świętokrzyska Street, now 4 Paris Commune Square. The building was completed after the war, with its form simplified. Its characteristic corner balconies, bent at right angles and typical of the "1937 style", were nevertheless retained.

The complex consists of:

- Szymel and Helena Wileński Tenement House
- Mieczysław Neufeld Villa
- Jakub Lando Townhouse

=== Other features ===
- Witcher Square (Polish: Skwer Wiedźmina), containing elements referring to motifs from The Witcher series by Andrzej Sapkowski.
- 1956 Hungarian Uprising Square (Polish: Skwer Powstania Węgierskiego 1956 roku), with a small ground-level fountain.
- The rear of the building complex extending from the Juliusz Heinzl Palace at 104 Piotrkowska Street, which includes premises of the Łódź City Hall.
