= PZInż 403 Lux-Sport =

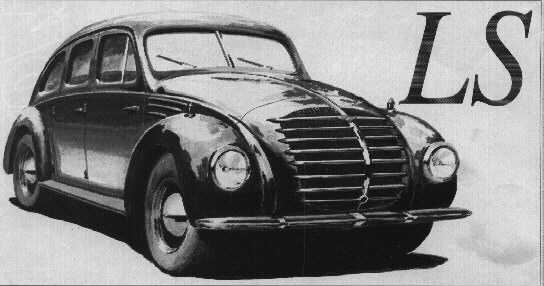
PZInż 403 Lux-Sport

The PZInż 403 Lux-Sport was a car designed by the Państwowe Zakłady Inżynieryjne (PZInż).

== History ==
In 1934, the Państwowe Zakłady Inżynieryjne started work on a Polish luxury car for government officials that would replace foreign automobiles. The project was led by Kazimierz Studzinski, and in five months the car was designed and a chassis was complete. The car was of a simple, yet modern construction designed by Alexsander Rummel and Mieczysław Dębicki, based on a central frame of two C-profiled beams. The car was called the Lux-Sport (or L-S) and had a completely independent suspension and used very long torsion bars as springing elements. The number of produced prototypes is not known, but at least one complete prototype, and one chassis for exhibitions were built. The PZInż 403 could have entered production in the 1940s, but the plans were abruptly stopped by the outbreak of World War II.

Though the prototype did not survive the war, the chassis was found after the war on a scrapyard. Today it is in the Museum Techniki in Warsaw.

== Specifications ==
- PZInż 405 V8 engine
  - 3.9 L (3888 cm^{3})
  - 96 horsepower (72 kW) at 3600 rpm
  - compression ratio 6.5:1
  - water-cooled
- 4-speed manual, electromagnetic planetary gearbox "Cotal" (similar to the modern Fiat Selespeed)
- 12 V electrical system
- Fully independent double wishbone suspension on each of four wheels, with height regulation from within the cabin
- Top speed: 135 km/h (84 mph)
- Weight: 1,200 kg (2,600 lb)
