= 75 mm armata wz.36 =

75 mm armata przeciwlotnicza wz.36
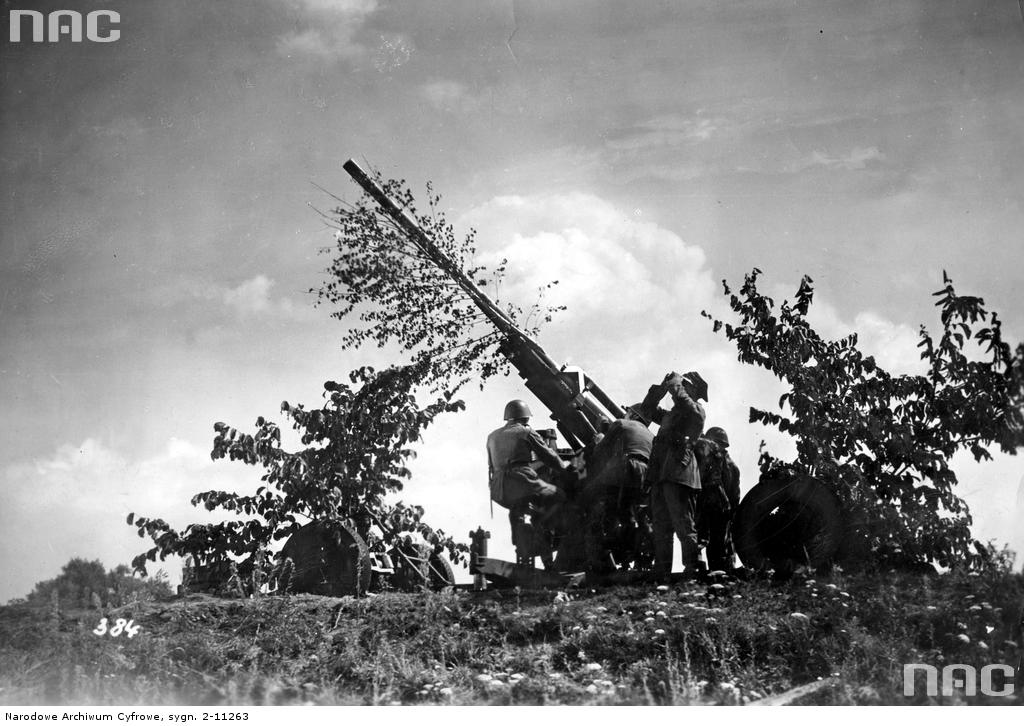
- Slovak soldiers in Polish uniforms manning a wz.36 in the German propaganda film Kampfgeschwader Lützow.
- Type: Anti-aircraft gun
- Place of origin: Second Polish Republic

Service history
- Used by: Second Polish Republic
- Wars: World War II

Production history
- Designer: Starachowice Works
- Designed: 1934
- Manufacturer: Starachowice Works
- Produced: 1937
- No. built: 52 delivered of 460 ordered.
- Variants: Mobile: wz.36 Static: wz.37

Specifications
- Mass: 3,700 kg (8,200 lb)
- Barrel length: 3.7 m (12 ft 2 in) L/50
- Crew: 8
- Shell: 75 X 639mm R
- Shell weight: 6.5 kg (14 lb 5 oz)
- Caliber: 7.5 cm (3.0 in)
- Breech: Semi-automatic horizontal sliding-wedge
- Recoil: Hydro-pneumatic
- Carriage: 4 wheel dual axle carriage with cruciform outriggers
- Elevation: -0° to +85°
- Traverse: 360°
- Rate of fire: 20-25 rpm
- Muzzle velocity: 800 m/s (2,600 ft/s)
- Effective firing range: 9.5 km (31,000 ft) AA ceiling
- Maximum firing range: 14.5 km (9.0 mi) horizontal

The 75 mm armata przeciwlotnicza wz.36 was a Polish designed and built anti-aircraft gun that was used during the Second World War.

== History ==
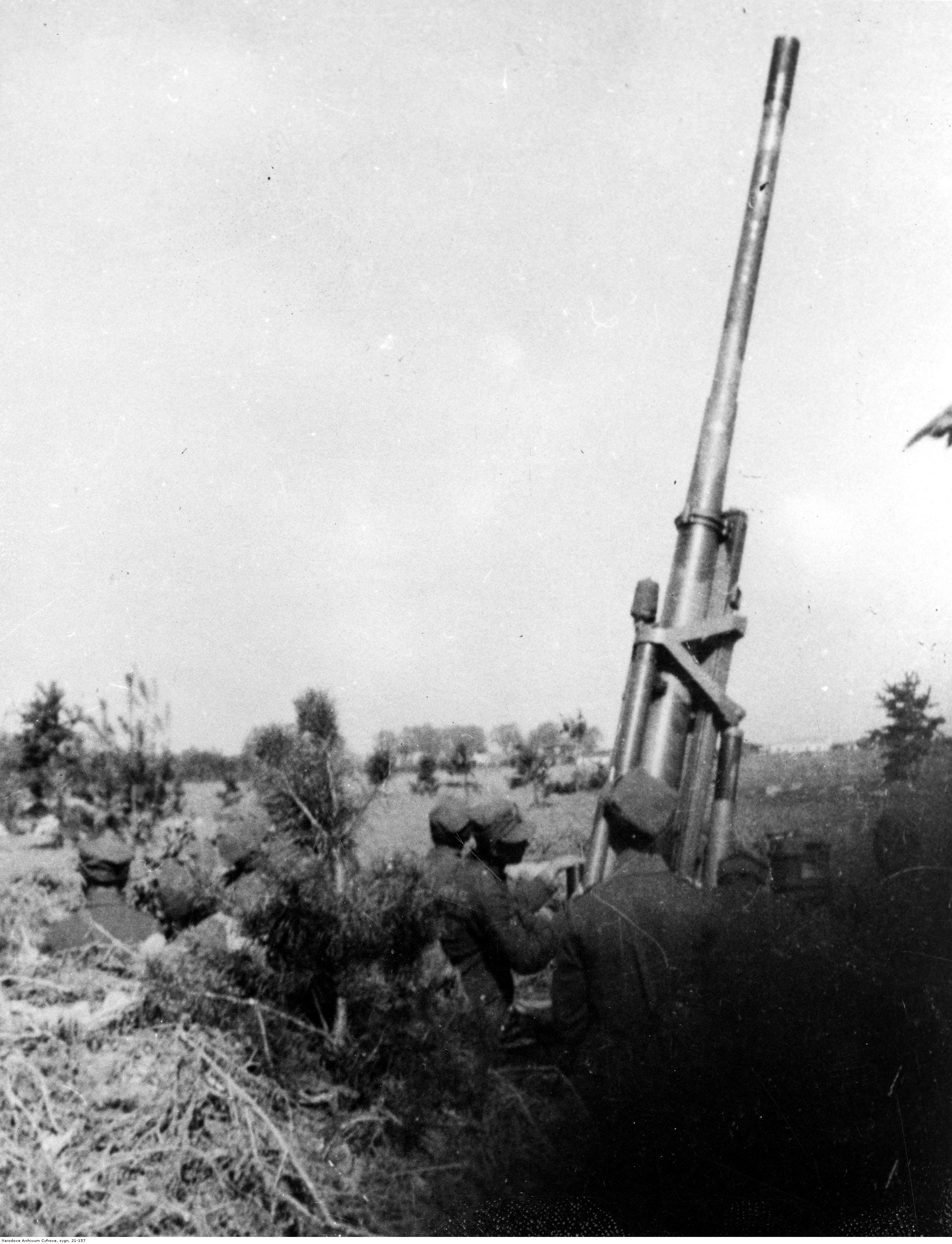

In 1933 the Starachowice Works received an official order to build prototypes for a 75 mm anti-aircraft gun. The design was completed in 1933 by the engineer Maj. Szymański from the Institute of Technology and Armaments. Who was assisted by Ing. Waclaw Stetkiewicz and M. Eng. Leszek Kistelski from the Starachowice Works. The first prototypes were completed and sent for testing in 1935. The report from the testing indicated minor deficiencies in the gun carriage, which it believed could be successfully resolved. However, it wasn't until 1937 that those defects were resolved and the wz.36 went into production.

Two variants were proposed, the wz.36 which was mobile anti-aircraft gun mounted on a four-wheeled dual-axle carriage with cruciform outriggers towed by a C4P half-track and the wz.37 a statically emplaced anti-aircraft gun. The Polish Army planned to acquire 60 mobile batteries of 3 guns (180) and 70 static batteries of 4 wz.37 guns (280) for the defense of high value targets. However, by the outbreak of war in 1939, only 52 of the 460 ordered had been built.

It is unknown how many wz.36/37 guns were captured by the Germans or what use they made of them during World War II. However, it is estimated that the Russians captured forty-nine 75 mm anti-aircraft guns of all types (75 mm armata przeciwlotnicza wz.1897/14/17, 75 mm armata przeciwlotnicza wz.1922/1924 and 75 mm armata przeciwlotnicza wz.36) during the Polish Campaign.

== Bibliography ==
- Andrzej Ciepliński, Ryszard Woźniak: Encyklopedia współczesnej broni palnej. Warszawa: Wydawnictwo WiS, 1994. ISBN 83-86028-01-7.
- Wiesław Słupczyński, Piotr Słupczyński: Armata przeciwlotnicza 75 mm wz. 36 i wz. 37. Siedlce 2013. ISBN 83-923353-4-1
- Broń strzelecka i sprzęt artyleryjski formacji polskich i WP w latach 1914-1939' A.Kontankiewicz
- P. Rozwadowski, Polskie armaty przeciwlotnicze 75 mm wz.36/37 oraz 40 mm Bofors, TbiU nr 183, Warszawa 1998,
- A. Rossa, Organizacja i przygotowanie polskiej obrony przeciwlotniczej wojska i kraju w latach 1936 - 1939, Bitwy września 1939 roku. Studia z dziejów polskich działań obronnych, t.VII, Koszalin 1999
