= Jerzy Werner =

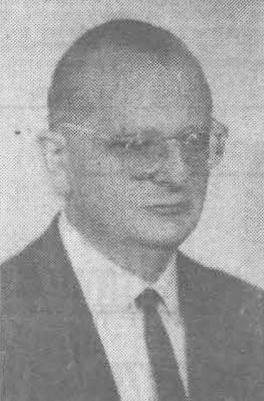
Jerzy Romuald Werner

Jerzy Werner (22 April 1909 Krosno, Galicia – 8 October 1977 Łódź) was a professor at the Technical University of Lodz, the constructor of the first Polish lorries, the Star 20 and Valentina, a builder of chassis for trucks at PZInż (National Industry Works) prior to World War II, and a Pawiak prisoner.

From 1962-1968, Werner was rector of the Technical University of Lodz; from 1965-1972, he was a Member of Parliament for the 4th and 5th terms of the Sejm of the Polish People’s Republic (as an independent politician).

Between world wars, Werner was a constructor of a truck chassis for the PZInż 703 and 713, which were much ahead of their time. He was also a constructor of the first Polish torque converter, and a creator of his own scientific school in the field of automotive engineering.

Decorations and Awards

- Order of the Banner of Labour 2nd Class
- Officer's Cross of the Order of Polonia Restituta
- Order of Polonia Restituta
- Medal of the 10th anniversary of Polish People's Republic
- Medal of the National Education Commission
- State Scientific Award of the second degree
- The City of Łodz Award

== Bibliography ==
- Ewa Chojnacka; Zbigniew Piotrowski; Ryszard Przybylski (2006). Profesorowie Politechniki Łódzkiej 1945–2005 (in Polish). Łódź: Wydawnictwo Politechniki Łódzkiej.
- "Werner Jerzy (1909-1977)". bs.sejm.gov.pl (in Polish).
