= Jakub Lando Townhouse =

Jakub Lando's Tenement House
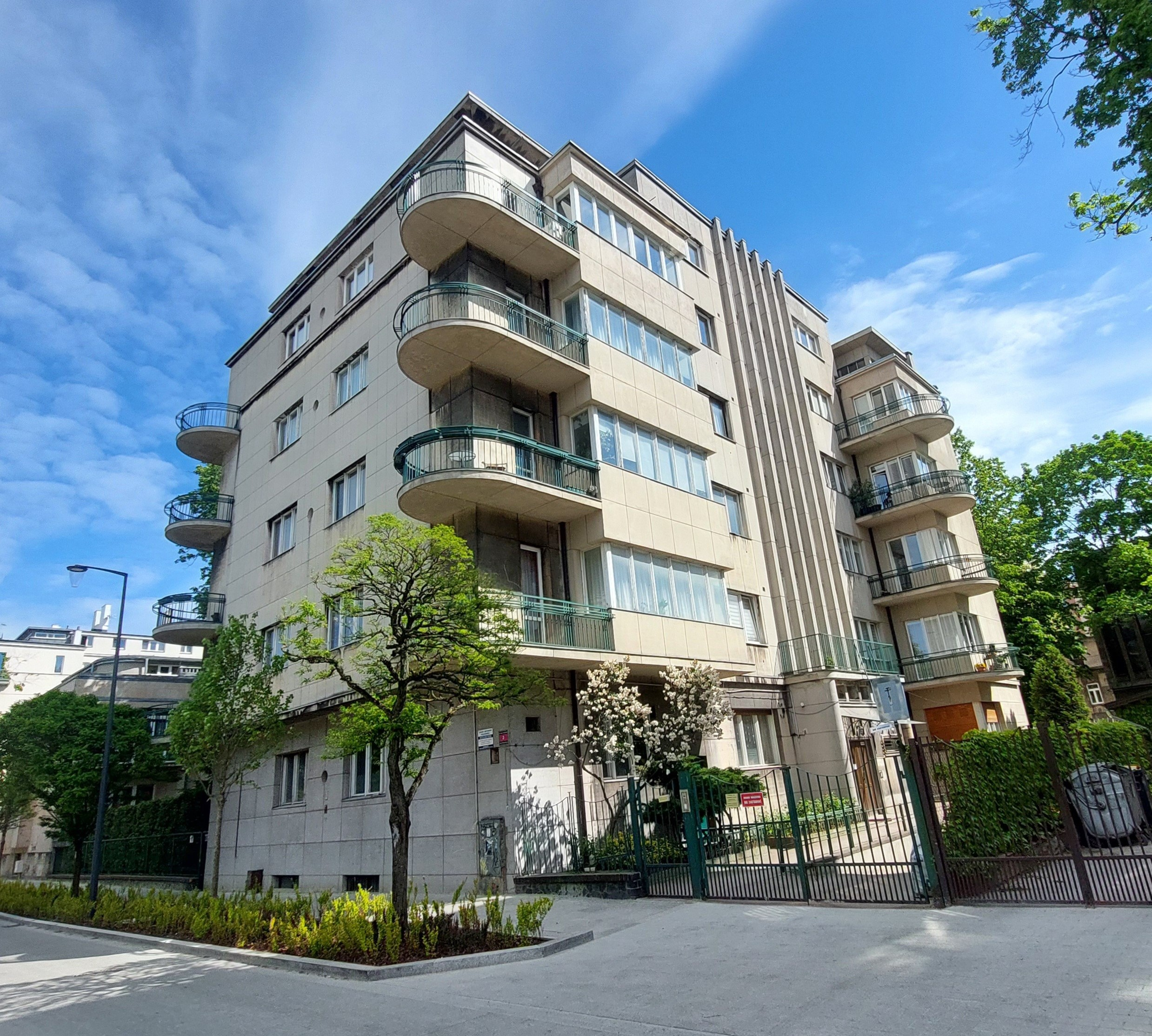
- The building in 2024

- Location within Poland

General information
- Architectural style: Modernism, Streamline Moderne
- Location: Łódź, Poland, 3 Komuny Paryskiej Square
- Coordinates: 51.764739°N 19.460649°E
- Construction started: 1936
- Completed: 1939
- Client: Jakub Lando

Technical details
- Floor count: 6

Design and construction
- Architect: Paweł Lewy

Jakub Lando's Tenement House is a historic apartment building at 3 Komuny Paryskiej Square in Łódź, Poland. It was built in 1936–1939 in the Modernist style with elements of Streamline Moderne, a style sometimes referred to in Poland at the time as the "ship style". The building is listed in the Łódź Voivodeship heritage register under number A/129.

Together with the neighbouring Mieczysław Neufeld's Villa and the Szymel and Helena Wileński Tenement House, it forms a distinctive group of luxury residential buildings representing interwar Modernist architecture in Łódź.

== Architecture ==
The six-storey building is positioned perpendicular to the street, with its gable-end front elevation facing the square. The top storey is set back from the main facade and surrounded by a terrace. The facade is covered with a two-colour decorative render imitating cladding made of rectangular stone slabs.

The entrance facade is articulated by an avant-corps containing balconies with semicircular ends. Lesenes divide a narrow window extending through the full height of the building.

The building contains eight identical four-room apartments. The attic originally contained laundry and drying rooms, while the basement housed an underground garage.

The building has been described as "one of the finest works of Łódź architecture of the late 1930s".
