= Ursus SA =

Polish agricultural machinery producer

Ursus S.A.
- Type: Public
- Industry: Agricultural machinery Automotive industry
- Founded: 1893 (Ursus); 1946 (POL-MOT Warfama); 1998 (Ursus Company)
- Headquarters: Lublin, Poland
- Area served: Worldwide
- Products: Tractors; Buses
- Number of employees: 794 (2016)
- Parent: Pol-Mot

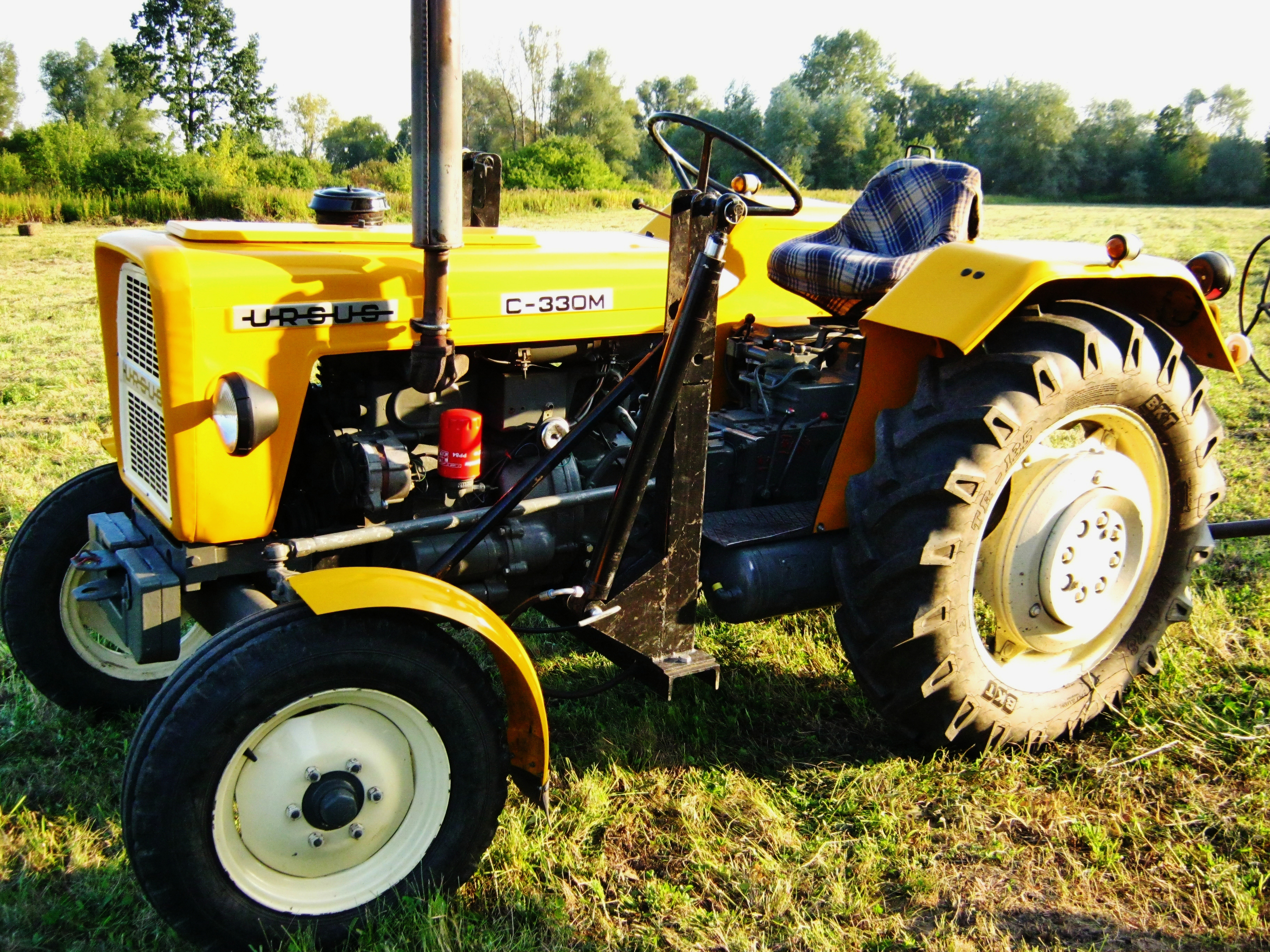
Ursus C-330, the most popular Polish tractor produced in 1967–1993

Ursus SA (often stylized URSUS SA) was a Polish agricultural machinery manufacturer, headquartered in Lublin, Poland. The company was founded in Warsaw in 1893, and holds a prominent place in Polish tractor production history. It has also carried out some production of trolleybuses in a joint venture with the Ukrainian manufacturer Bogdan, and manufactures buses, coaches, and trolleybuses in a joint venture with Polish manufacturer AMZ Kutno under the name Ursus Bus. The company was purchased by Pol-Mot in 2011.

The name means 'bear' in Latin.

== History ==
=== Early history ===
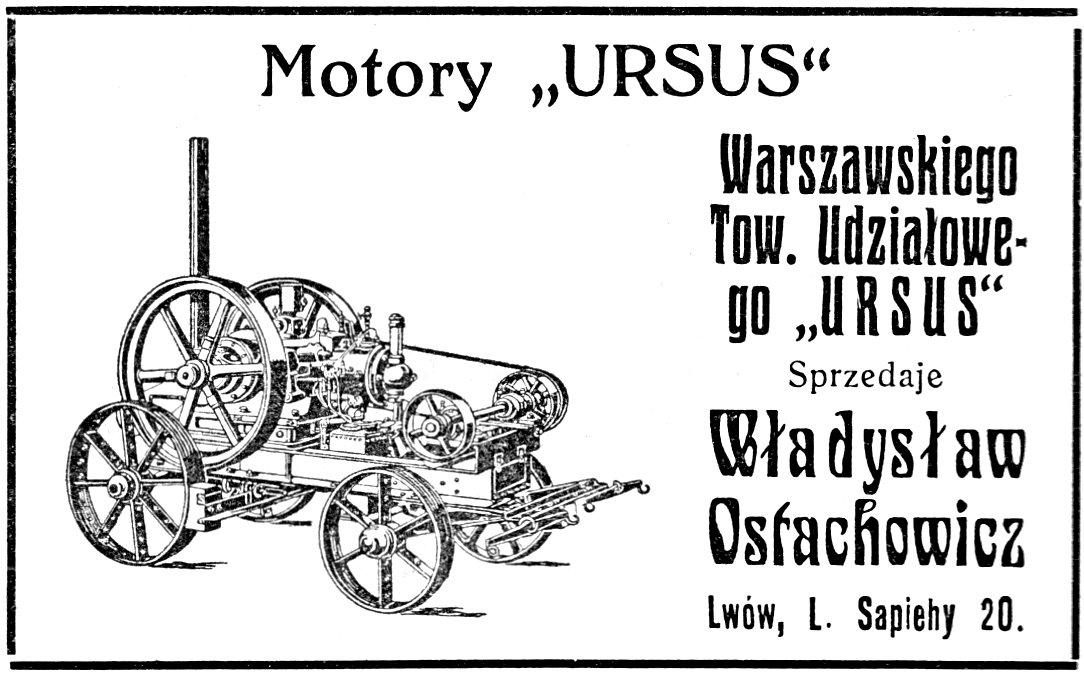
Ursus advertisement from 1914

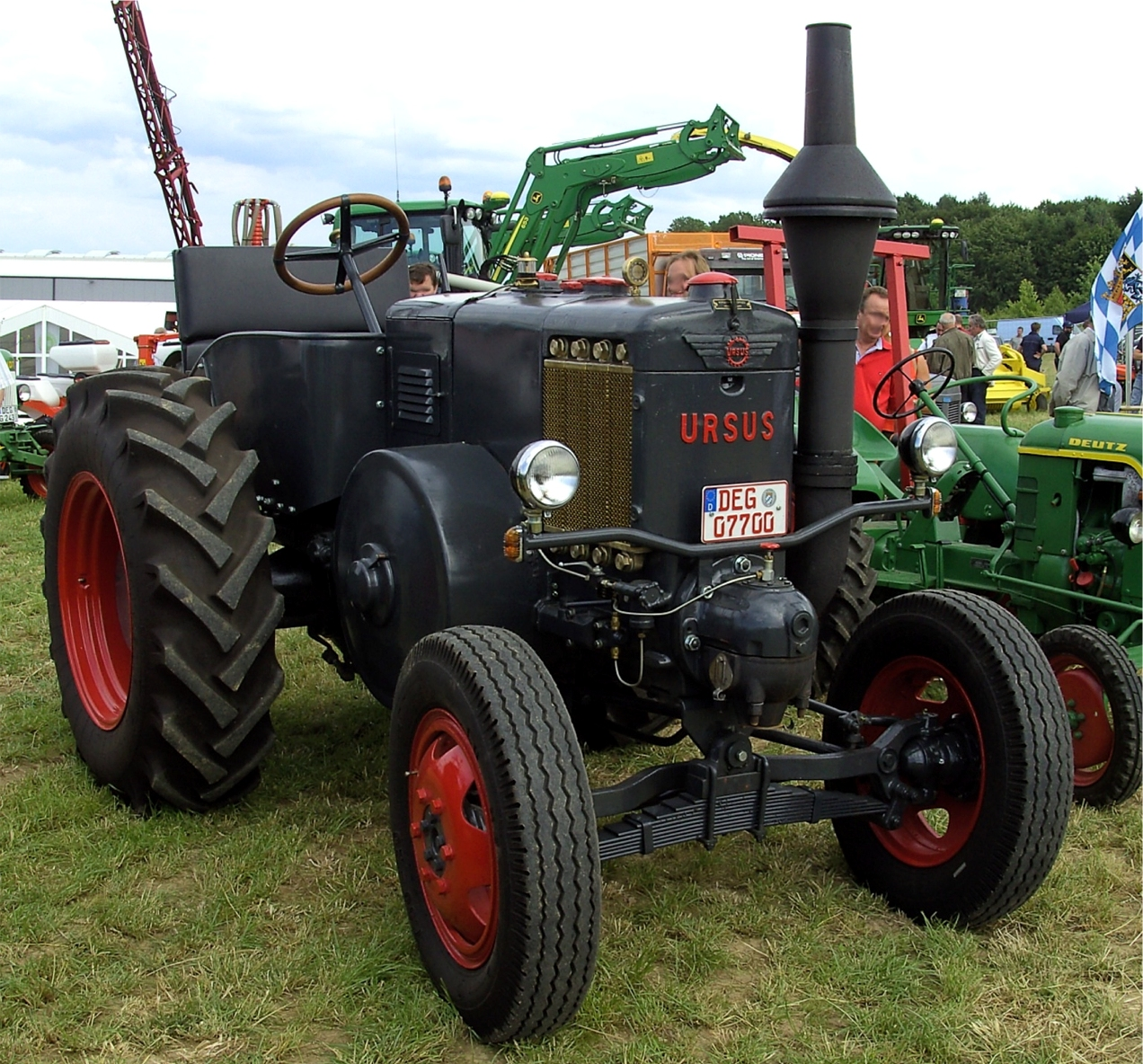
Post-war Ursus C-45

The Ursus Factory was founded in 1893 on 15 Sienna Street, Warsaw, by three engineers and four businessmen. It was first named: Towarzystwo Udziałowe Specyalnej Fabryki Armatur (Company of a Special Factory of Fixture), later with an addition: i Motorów (and Motors). It began producing valves and pumps, intended first of all to Tsarist Russian market, as Poland had been partitioned by that time and most of its territory was annexed by Russia. In 1902 the factory started producing internal combustion engines. They were first patterned upon 5 HP Bolinder engines with a horizontal cylinder. In 1910 a new bigger engine factory was built in Wola village at Skierniewicka street (currently Warsaw). The factory specialized in stationary or transportable engines for industry and agriculture, with power up to 80 HP. By World War I around 6,000 different engines were produced, including 600 HP marine engines.

Originally, the factory used a trademark: P7P, which stood for Posag 7 Panien, or "dowry of 7 maidens" – namely, the daughters of the factory's founders, who donated their dowries to the initial capital. In 1903 (other sources claim 1907), when the factory began to produce internal combustion engines, the word Ursus (Latin for bear) was added to the logo, inspired by the character from Henryk Sienkiewicz's novel Quo Vadis.

During World War I, in 1915 Russians took away part of factory equipment. After the war, independent Poland was looted by the war, main export market was lost due to Bolshevik revolution, and the company had no funds to modernize its production. In 1920 it was reorganized as a public share company (S.A.). It also started to repair Polish Army trucks. From 1922, the company built a limited number of its first and only interwar agricultural tractor, based upon International Harvester Titan. In 1922 it also changed its name to Zakłady Mechaniczne Ursus (Ursus Mechanical Works). In connection with plans to produce a truck chosen by the Polish Army, the company received a credit and in 1924 built a new big factory in Czechowice (later renamed Ursus and included into Warsaw). The factory was however oversized comparing with orders, and in addition, there appeared delays with its readiness. From 1928, the factory started to manufacture Ursus A truck, by the licence of Italian SPA 25C, being the first truck produced in Poland.

In 1930, the Ursus factory fell on hard times due to the world financial crisis and was nationalised under the Państwowe Zakłady Inżynieryjne (National Engineering Works, PZInż), the Polish manufacturer of arms and vehicles. It then began producing military tractors, tanks and other heavy machinery for troops. During the German occupation of Poland in World War II the factory was controlled by FAMO and produced Panzer II, Marder II and Wespe AFVs. After the war, the Ursus Factory started producing the Ursus C-45, a copy of the German pre-war Lanz Bulldog tractor. During the 1950s, the Ursus factory began producing tractors using a Zetor-based design.

By 1961, there was a growing need for tractors in Poland, but the tractors produced by the Ursus factory did not meet the needs of Polish agriculture. A bilateral agreement was created between Poland and Czechoslovakia, where Czechoslovakia would provide the Ursus factory with the parts necessary to enlarge and modernise the factory and in exchange, Poland would supply Czechoslovak factories with raw materials. The goal was to construct a joint tractor industry where Poland and Czechoslovakia would combine to produce 120,000 tractors per year, as in 1963 Poland was only producing 15,000.

=== Solidarity ===
Workers of the Ursus tractor factory played a large role in the solidarity movement in the 1970s and 1980s. On 25 June 1976 in response to a rise in food prices, the workers of Ursus, acting in solidarity with workers in Radom and many other areas, went on strike and blocked and destroyed parts of the main east–west and north–south rail lines leaving Warsaw. This was one of the largest and most disruptive strikes that occurred that day, and resulted in the prime minister announcing on television the withdrawal of the food price increase.

In 1980, workers of the Ursus factory went on strike and spent the night at the factory to protest the detention of Jan Narozniak, a volunteer printing worker at the Warsaw chapter of Solidarity. Also in 1980, 16,000 workers threatened to stop coming to work on Saturdays in order to self-enforce the five-day work week proclaimed by the Solidarity movement. In 1988, 200 workers in the Ursus factory occupied the plant canteen and demanded that the management petition for increased wages, the release of imprisoned workers, and the legalisation of Solidarity and the Independent Students' Association.

=== Investment under Gierek ===
The Ursus factory was the focus of an extensive investment initiative in the 1970s under Edward Gierek. Under this programme, large loans were taken from western banks for the purpose of importing modern equipment and methods that would cause expansion of Polish industry and growth of the Polish economy. In 1977, a 7.9 million dollar export-import bank loan and a 7 million dollar loan from private American banks were granted to the Ursus tractor factory for the purpose of purchasing machine tools from the Ingersoll Milling Machine Company of Rockford, Illinois, and Gleason Works in Rochester, New York. However, such investment programmes became inefficient and failed, leaving Poland with an immense debt.

By 1980, 25 billion dollars were locked into inefficient, unfinished projects in Polish industry that were speculated to require an additional 50 billion dollars to complete. The Ursus Tractor Factory was one of the largest victims of this problem. By 1981, equipment that had been purchased in the West at the Ursus Factory amounted to 3,600 million złoty. Warehouse space at Ursus was filled with unused, unnecessary supplies, e.g. a stock of 1.6 million rarely used screws, and since construction of new warehouse space had stopped, other supplies were left to deteriorate outside. Gierek had invested nearly 1 billion dollars into a project of developing a modern Massey Ferguson model of tractor at Ursus, however due to licensing problems, these tractors could not be sold in the Western Bloc during the Cold War for political reasons, and in the Eastern Bloc neither because they were too expensive. Instead of the targeted production of 75,000 tractors per year, only 500 were made.

=== Recent history ===
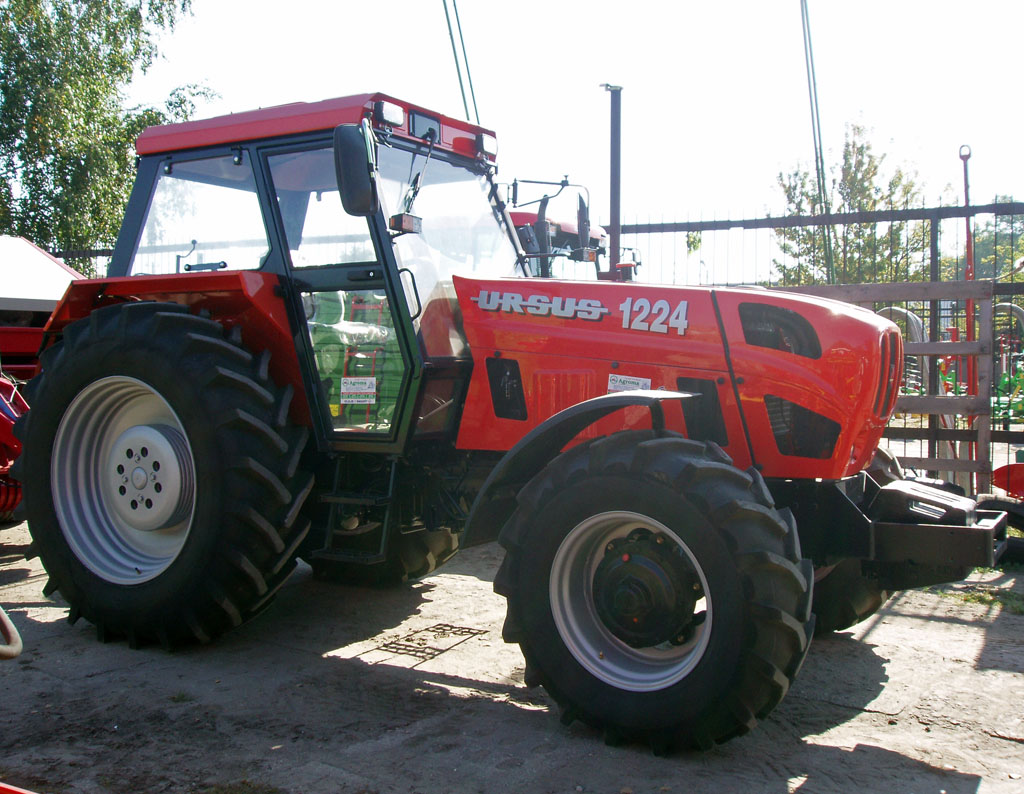
Ursus 1224

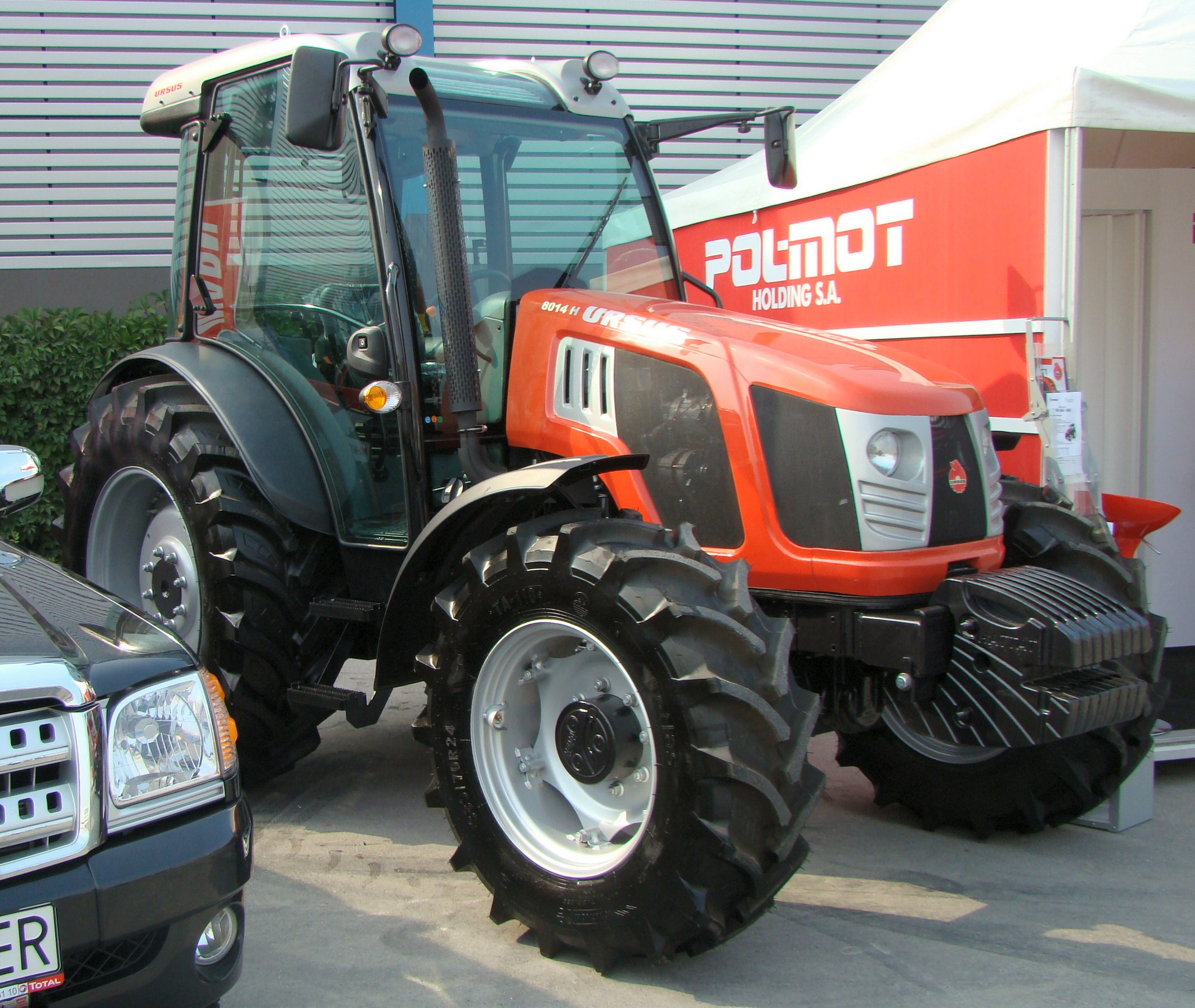
Ursus 8014H

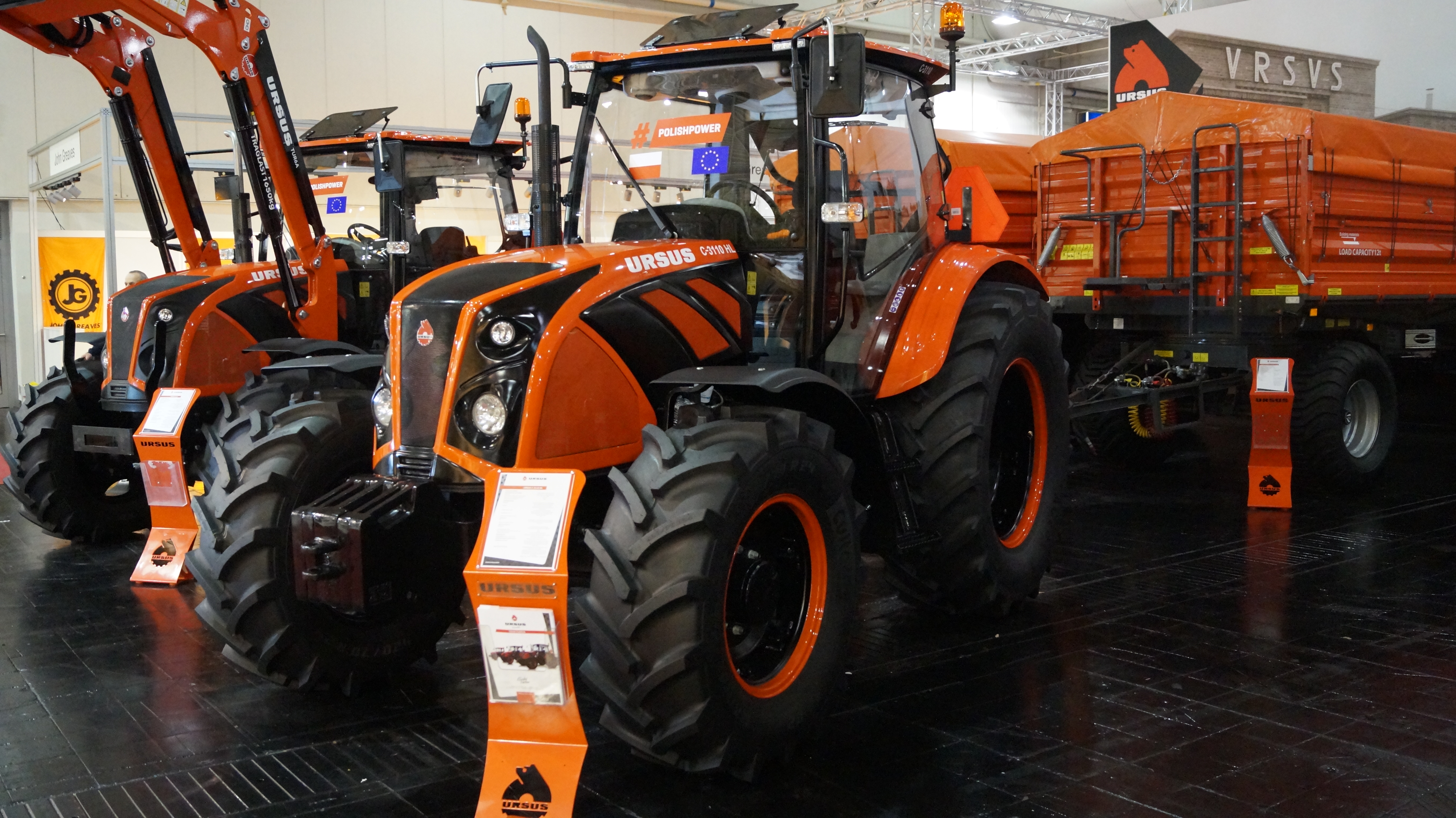
Ursus C-3110 HL at Agritechnica 2017 fairs

Ursus' tractor production declined throughout the 1990s, falling from 60,000 tractors per year in 1980 to about 16,000 tractors in 1995. The decline in production was due to the enormous debt that Ursus had contracted as a result of its expansion programme in the 1980s. The need to repay the debt blocked access to funds needed for the daily operations of the factory. In 1996, 550 million złoty, 80% of Ursus’ debt, owed to nearly 700 creditors, was written off. Tractor sales continued to decline to an all-time low of 1,578 units in 2006.

URSUS Company was established in the years 1998–2003 as a consequence of restructuring and cooperation of PHZ "Bumar" Ltd., ZPC URSUS SA and Ursus Tractor Factory Ltd. The company is still producing Ursus tractors. Bumar Ltd became the main shareholder of Ursus Company, leading to Ursus becoming part of Bumar Industrial Group, which is marketing Ursus products both on foreign and domestic markets.

In 2007, Uzel Holding of Turkey announced they were buying 51% of Ursus. Both Uzel and Ursus are, or were, licensees of AGCO's Massey Ferguson. In 2008 it was announced that Uzel had not kept up to its commitments, and TAFE and Pol-Mot were interested in buying.

In 2011 Pol-Mot bought the Ursus Company from Bumar Ltd. Recently, the company is expanding its business in Central Europe and other countries, as well as planning to produce electric buses.

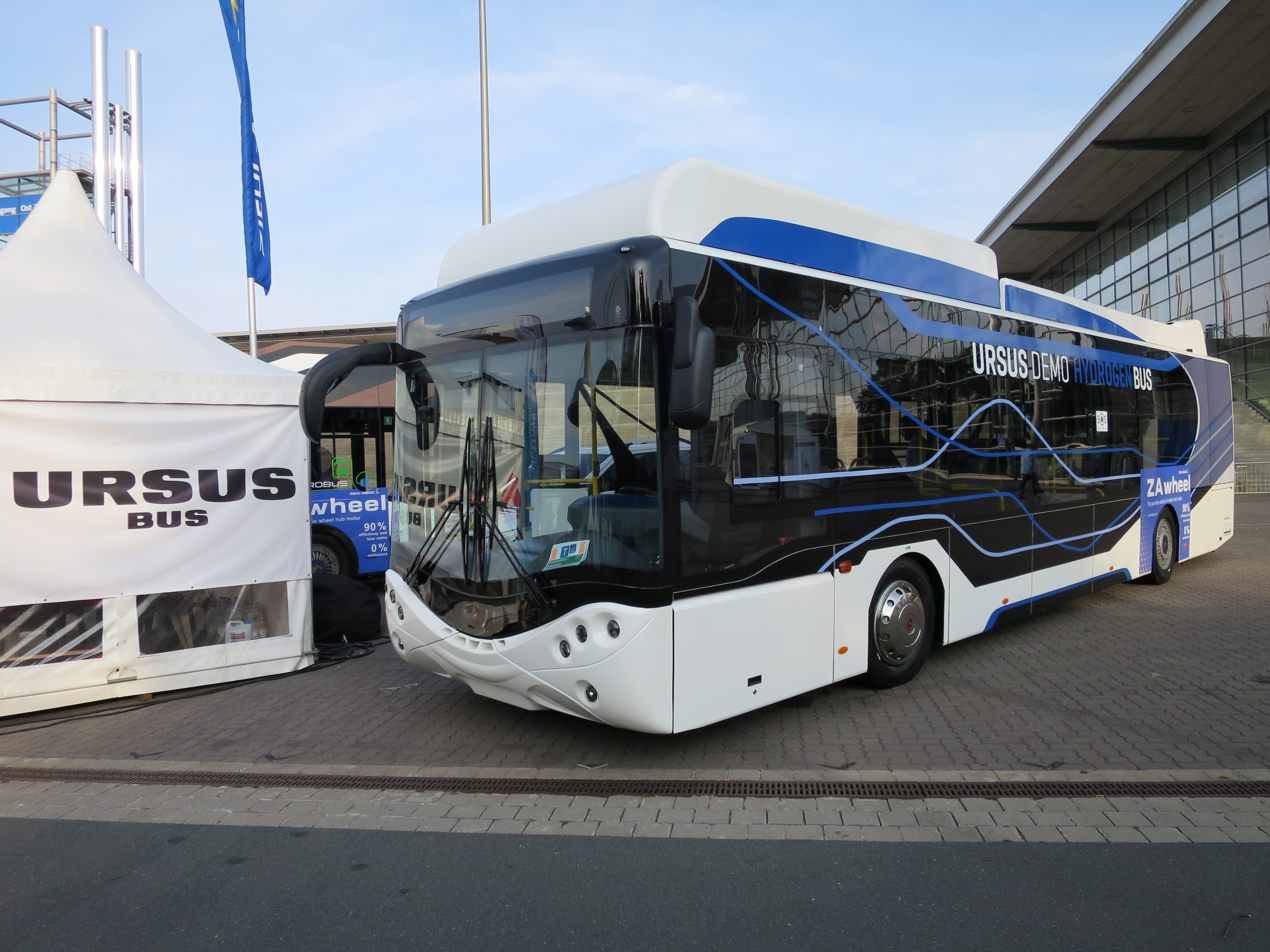
Ursus City Smile

In 2013, a joint venture between Ursus and the Ukrainian company Bogdan received an order for 38 trolleybuses for the Lublin, Poland, trolleybus system. The body-and-chassis shells were completed by Bogdan and shipped to an Ursus plant in Lublin, where Ursus would install the axles, electrical propulsion equipment (supplied by Cegelec), seats and other fittings, to complete the vehicles. The first of the 38 Urbus/Bogdan trolleybuses, officially designated as model Ursus T70116, was delivered in mid-2013, and the last in mid-2015.

Ursus signed an agreement worth US$10 million in 2014 to deliver 3,000 tractors to Ethiopia

== Models ==
=== Tractors ===
- Ursus 1921/1922
- Ursus C-45
- Ursus C-308
- Ursus C-325
- Ursus C-328
- Ursus C-330/Ursus C-330M
- Ursus C-335/Ursus C-335M
- Ursus C-4011
- Ursus C-350/Ursus C-355
- Ursus C-360/Ursus C-360-3P
- Ursus C-362
- Ursus C-380/Ursus C-380M
- Ursus C-382
- Ursus C-385/Ursus C-385A
- Ursus C-392
- Ursus C-3102
- Ursus C-3110
- Ursus 902/Ursus 904
- Ursus 932/Ursus 934
- Ursus 1002 / 1004
- Ursus 1032 / 1034
- Ursus 1042 / 1044
- Ursus 1132 / 1134
- Ursus 1154
- Ursus 1201/
- Ursus 1204
- Ursus 1222 / 1224
- Ursus 1232 / 1234
- Ursus 1434
- Ursus 1614
- Ursus 1634
- Ursus 1654
- Ursus 1674
- Ursus 1734
- Ursus 1934
- Ursus 1954
- Ursus 2802
- Ursus 2812
- Ursus 3502/4502
- Ursus 3512/3514
- Ursus 3702
- Ursus 3722/3724
- Ursus 3822/3824
- Ursus 4022/4024
- Ursus 4512/4514
- Ursus 4822/4824
- Ursus 5024/6024
- Ursus 5044
- Ursus 5312/5314
- Ursus 5322/5324
- Ursus 5524
- Ursus 5714
- Ursus 6012/6014
- Ursus 6614
- Ursus 6824
- Ursus 7524
- Ursus 8024
- Ursus 8034
- Ursus 8014 H
- Ursus 9014 H
- Ursus 10014 H
- Ursus 11024
- Ursus U-4150

== Prototypes ==
- Ursus C-336
- Ursus C-342
- Ursus C-330 3P
- Ursus C-355P
- Ursus C-355D
- Ursus C-356
- Ursus 202
- Ursus 944
- Ursus 1242/1244
- Ursus 1414S
- Ursus 4504
- Ursus 6424
- Ursus U-310
- Ursus U-510
- Ursus U-610
- Ursus U-710
- Ursus 14034
- Ursus 11034
- Ursus 10014T

== See also ==
- Ursus Bus

== Sources ==
- Open Society Archive
  - Polish-Czechoslovak Economic Co-Operation Since the Prague Declaration of 30 September 1961
  - https://web.archive.org/web/20080106191952/http://files.osa.ceu.hu/holdings/300/8/3/text/46-1-243.shtml
  - https://web.archive.org/web/20080106191931/http://files.osa.ceu.hu/holdings/300/8/3/text/44-6-190.shtml
  - https://web.archive.org/web/20080106191946/http://files.osa.ceu.hu/holdings/300/8/3/text/45-4-220.shtml
- The Warsaw Voice
  - http://www.warsawvoice.pl/archiwum.phtml/2713/
- Poland Business Network
  - https://web.archive.org/web/20070927175626/http://www.polandbusinessnetwork.pl/news/index.php?contentid=140152
- Time Magazine**
- Glajzer, Andrzej (2007). Samochody ciężarowe Ursus 1928 – 1930 (in Polish). Warsaw: ZP Grupa. ISBN 978-83-925916-1-0.
