= Polski Fiat 621 =

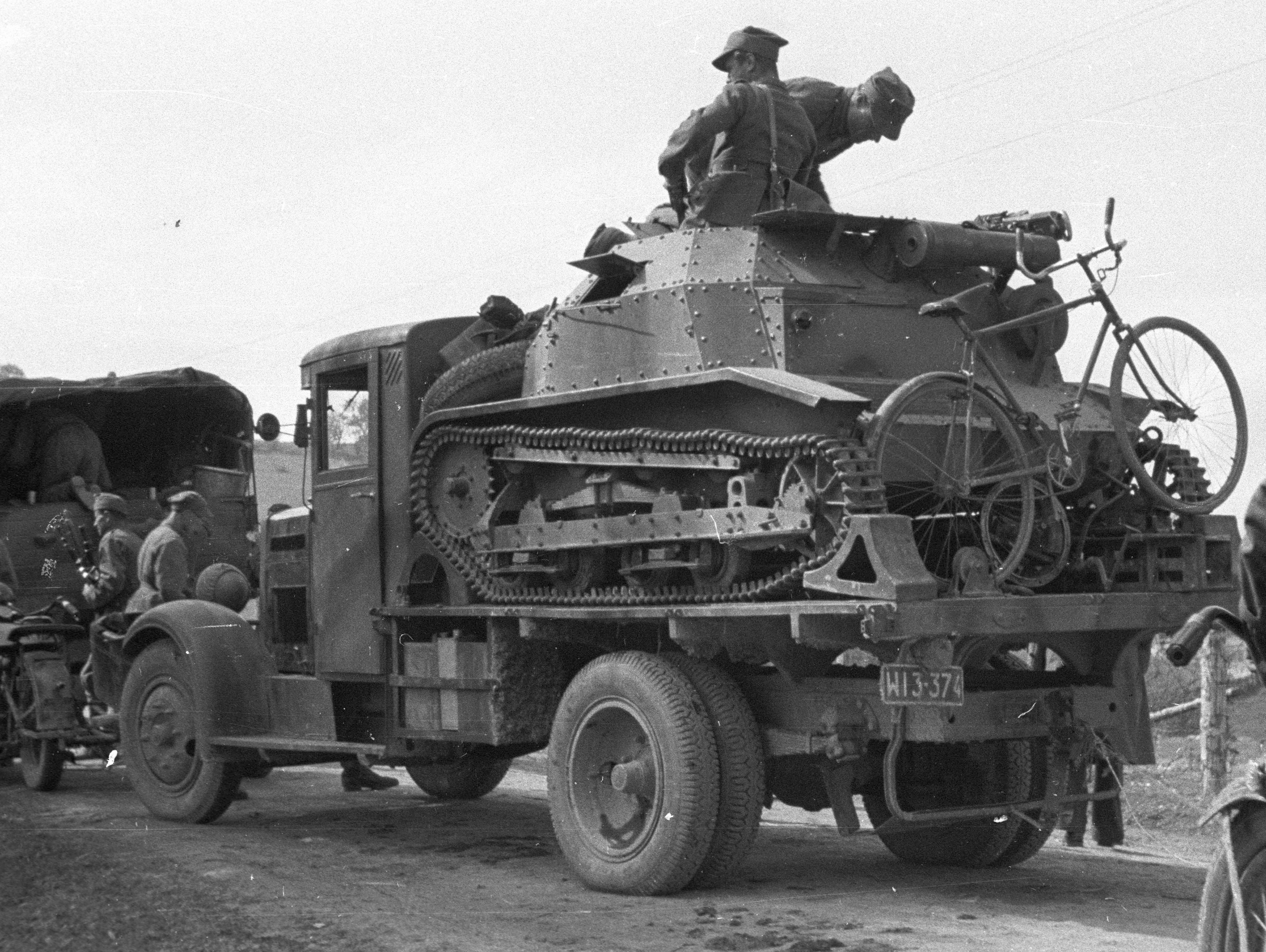
- Polski Fiat 621 L carrying a TKS tankette.

Overview
- Manufacturer: PZInż
- Also called: Fiat 621

Body and chassis
- Class: Medium truck
- Related: Fiat 621

Powertrain
- Engine: 2952 cc Fiat 122B (PZInż. 387) petrol I6, 33,9 kW at 2600 rpm
- Transmission: 4-speed manual

Dimensions
- Wheelbase: 3650 mm
- Length: 5780 mm
- Width: 2070 mm
- Height: 2620 mm
- Curb weight: cca 2350 kg

Polski Fiat 621 was a Polish 2.5-tonne truck, the basic lorry of the Polish Army during the 1930s. It was built under an agreement between Fiat and PZInż. The Polish version of the Fiat 621 was heavily modified to better suit Polish needs and cope with the harsh weather and bad roads in Poland. The undercarriage was produced in two variants: The Polski Fiat 621 L was the basic variant to receive a number of superstructures while the Polski Fiat 621 R was used as the basis for a line of successful buses for the civilian market and heavier, 3-tonne lorries for the army.

The modifications to the original Fiat design included:

- Strengthened undercarriage (frame, front and rear axles)
- New leaf springs, joints and shock absorbers
- Wider wheelbase
- Redesigned mounting of cab doors
- A Larger fuel tank for both gasoline and diesel versions
- Cylinder block redesigned and produced of high-quality steel
- Weber carburettor replaced with a simpler and easier to maintain construction by Solex

Serial production started in 1935 at the Państwowe Zakłady Inżynieryjne Works and lasted until 1939. In 1940 the production was to be replaced with the PZInż 703 family of trucks. Upon the outbreak of World War II and invasion of Poland, all production ceased; those 621s that were not destroyed in the fighting were captured by Nazi Germany or the Soviet Union as the two occupied the country.

An unspecified number were also used by Romanian Army during WW2.

== See also ==
- C4P
