= Ursus Bus =

Polish bus manufacturer

- Company type: Public
- Industry: Automotive industry
- Founded: 2015; 11 years ago
- Headquarters: Lublin, Poland
- Area served: Worldwide
- Products: Buses

Ursus Bus is a Polish bus, coach, trolleybus manufacturer based in Lublin, Poland. The company was founded in 2015 by URSUS S.A. and AMZ-KUTNO S.A.

== Products ==
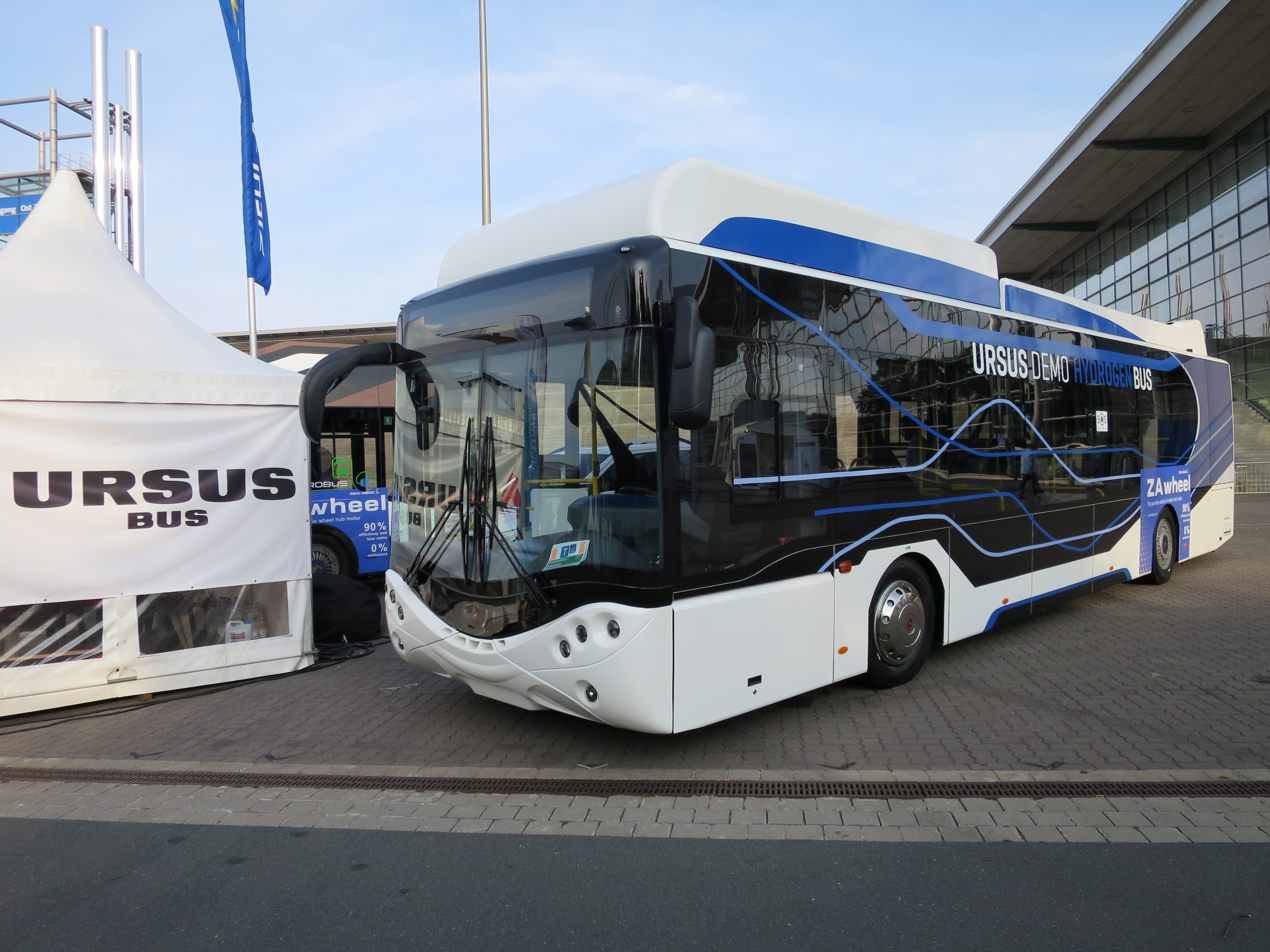
Ursus City Smile

=== Current electric models ===
- Ursus Ekovolt – low-floor 12m electric city bus
- Ursus City Smile 8.5E – low-floor 8,5m electric city bus
- Ursus City Smile 10E – low-floor 10m electric city bus
- Ursus City Smile 12E – low-floor 12m electric city bus
- Ursus City Smile 18E – low-floor 18m electric city bus

=== Current Diesel models ===
- Ursus City Smile 10M LF – low-floor 10m city bus
- Ursus City Smile 12M LF – low-floor 12m city bus

=== Trolleybuses ===
- Ursus T70116 – low-floor 12,50m trolleybus

== See also ==
- Autosan
- Electric bus
- Electric vehicle conversion
- Hispano Carrocera
- Solaris Bus & Coach
- Ursus Factory
