= Państwowe Zakłady Inżynierii =

Polish pre-World War II arms industry holding

PZInż
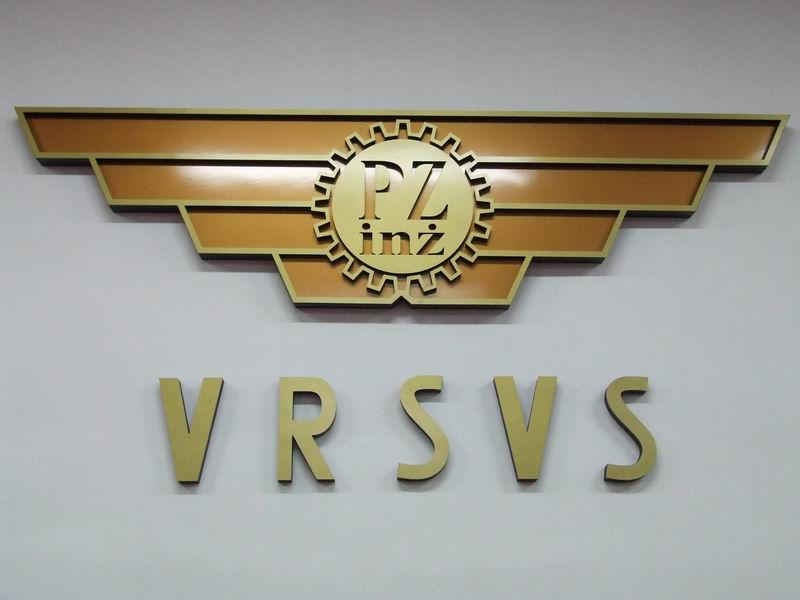
- Industry: Automotive
- Founded: 1928
- Founder: Eugeniusz Kwiatkowski
- Defunct: 1939 (II World War)
- Headquarters: Warsaw, Poland
- Products: Automobiles, trucks, tanks, motorcycle

The Państwowe Zakłady Inżynierii (National Engineering Works, PZInż) was a Polish pre-World War II arms industry holding and the main Polish manufacturer of vehicles, both military and civilian.

== History ==
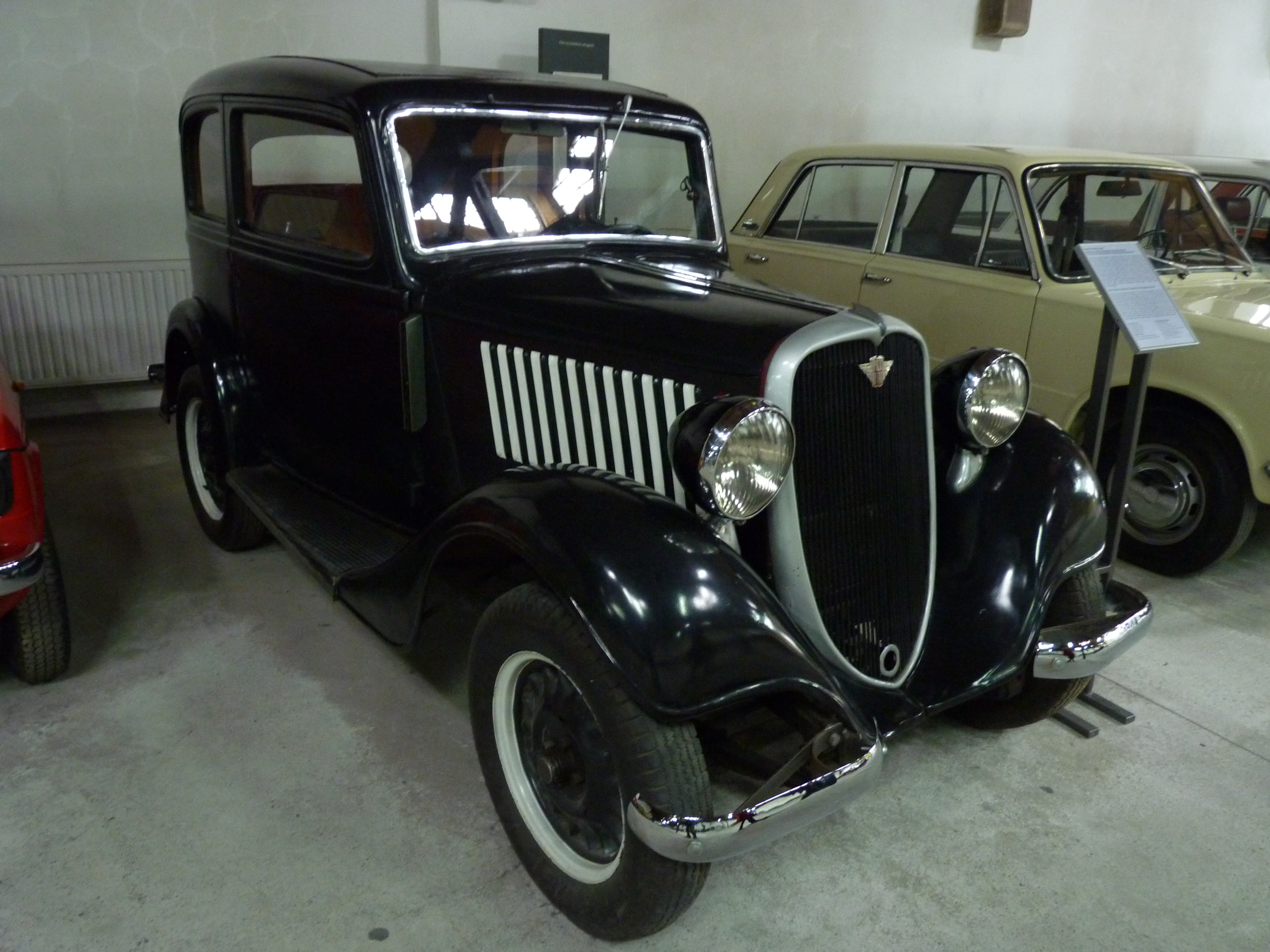
Polski Fiat 508 III Junak

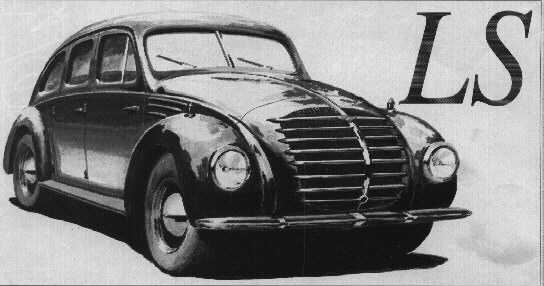
PZInż 403 Lux-Sport

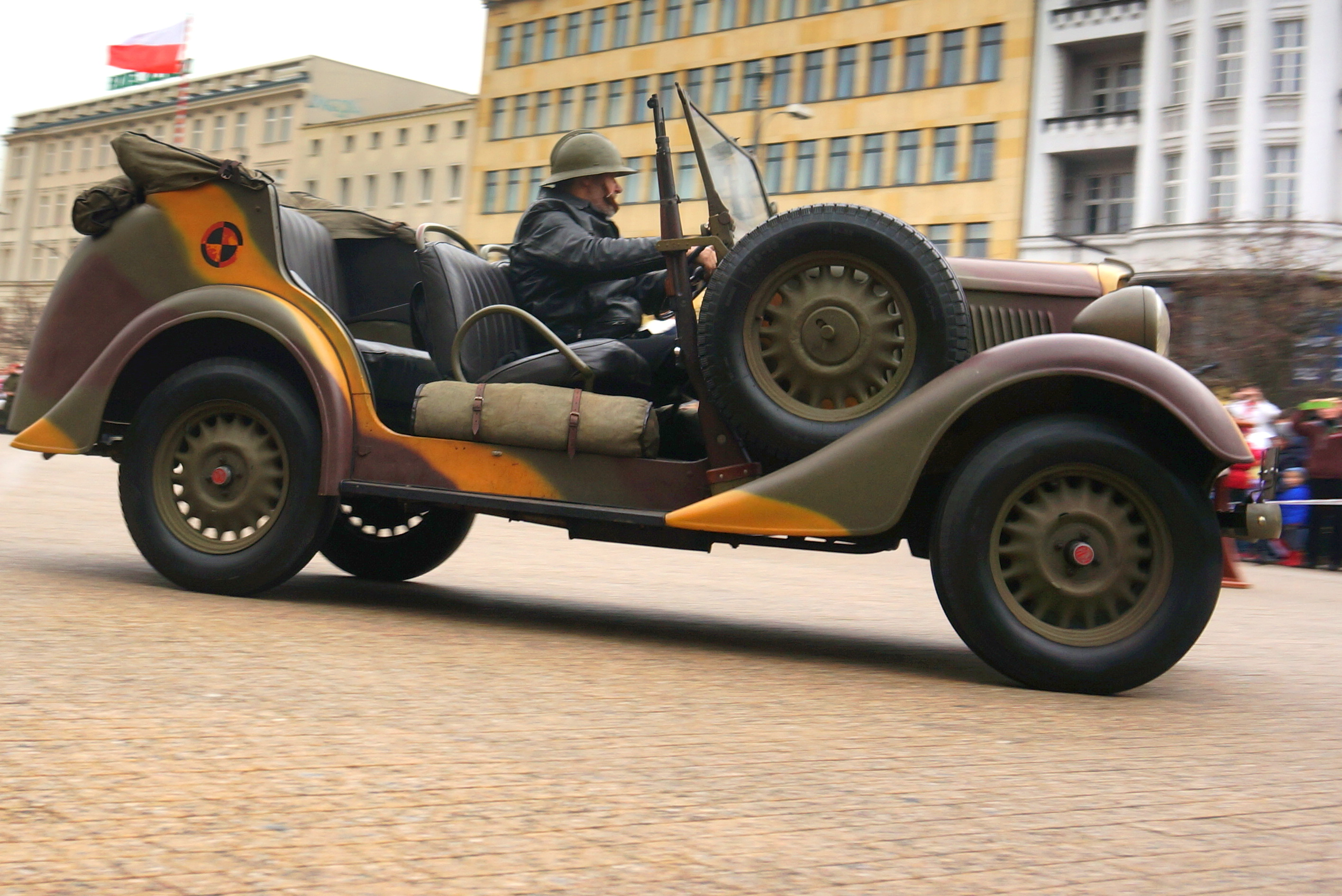
Polski Fiat 508 III/W Łazik (1936–1939)

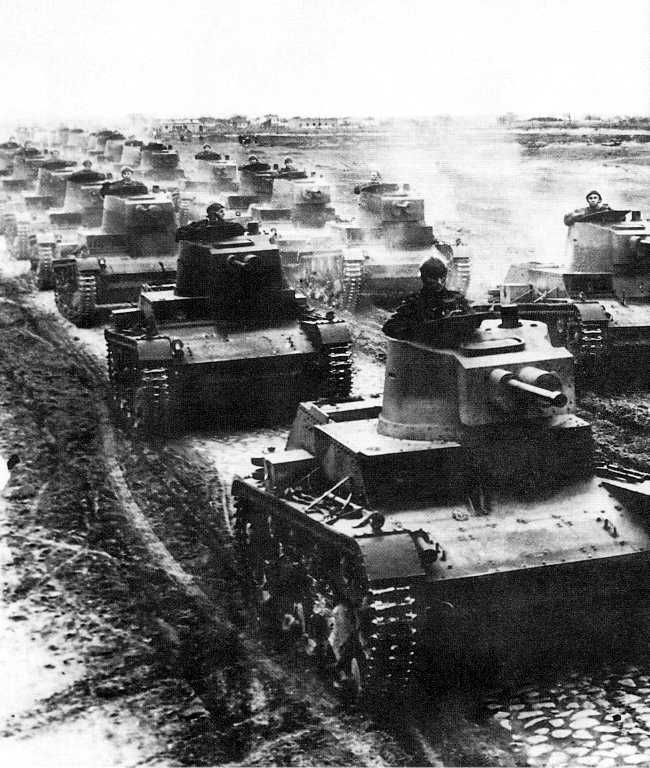
Polish 7TP tanks during military exercises, before 1939

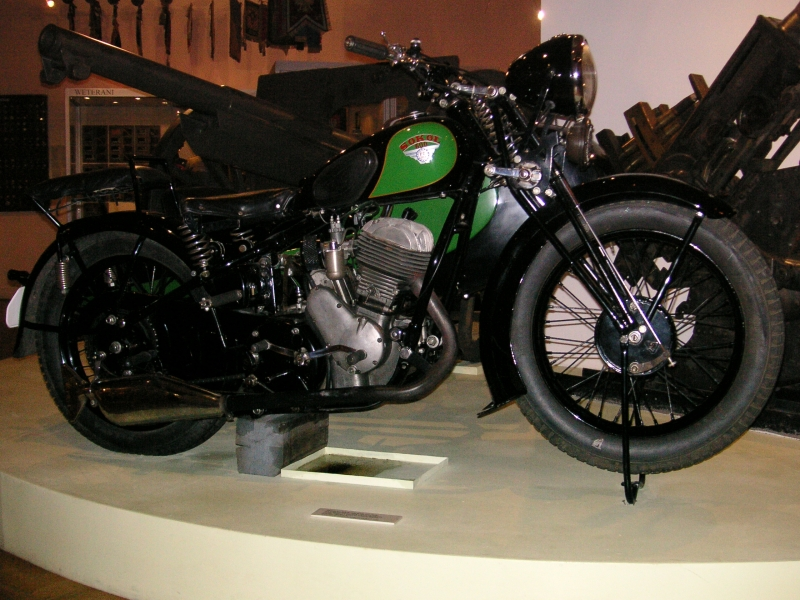
Sokół 600

It was created by the Polish minister of industry Eugeniusz Kwiatkowski on 19 March 1928 from several previously-existing state-owned factories and scientific institutes, among them the Centralne Warsztaty Samochodowe and the Ursus factory. It was Kwiatkowski's plan of reorganization and modernization of Polish arms industry that eventually led to the creation of PZInż, but also the Państwowe Wytwórnie Uzbrojenia (National Arms Works), Państwowe Zakłady Lotnicze (modern PZL), Państwowe Zakłady Optyczne (National Optical Works) and National Factory of Gunpowder and Explosives in Pionki.

== Production ==
On 21 September 1931 the National Engineering Works signed a license agreement with Italian automobile manufacturer Fiat. Soon afterwards, assembly and production of Fiat 508 began. Until September 1939, some 10,000 models were produced in Warsaw’s Factory of Passenger and Light Commercial Vehicles (Fabryka Samochodow Osobowych i Polciezarowych).

In 1933, the PZInz was restructured, and divided into the following units:

- main office and technical office in Warsaw,
- Ursus Truck Factory,
- Factory of Passenger and Light Commercial Vehicles (also Polski Fiat Factory later FSO) in Warsaw,
- Engine and Equipment Plant in Warsaw,
- Ursus Foundry, in Ursus, Warsaw,
- Modlin Shipyard, which produced ORP Rybitwa and ORP Czajka,
- Service Station in Warsaw.

Among vehicles produced by the National Engineering Works, are such models, as:

- artillery tractors: C2P, C4P, C7P
- passenger cars: Fiat 508, Fiat 518, Fiat 524, PZInz L-S
- trucks: Fiat 618, Fiat 621, Ursus Typ A
- light tank 7TP (pictured)
- all terrain vehicles and tractors Fiat 621 C4P, PZInż 222, PZInż 703
- Sokol motorcycles
- autobus Zawrat
- armored cars, Ursus wz.29, Ursus wz.34.

As well as vehicles PZInż also produced aero-engines under licence to various foreign manufacturers, such as:

- P.Z. Inż. Junior 120 hp - Walter Junior from Czechoslovakia
- P.Z. Inż. Major - Walter Major from Czechoslovakia
- P.Z. Inż. Minor - Walter Minor from Czechoslovakia

The National Engineering Works also had several prototypes, which did not enter production due to invasion of Poland by Nazi Germany and the Soviet Union.

Shortly after the outbreak of World War II and the German occupation of Poland, the PZInż was confiscated by the German state, its factories dismantled and sent to Germany while a large part of the engineers were either killed or sent to Germany as slave workers. After the Warsaw Uprising the Warsaw headquarters of the PZInż was blown up, not to be rebuilt after the war. In 1946 the Ursus works started to be rebuilt and eventually became a large tractor factory.

== See also ==
- CWS T-1
- Ursus Factory
