= PZInż 703 =

PZInż 703 and its development versions PZInż 713 and PZInż 723 were a family of Polish trucks, lorries, buses and artillery trailers. Designed by a team at Państwowe Zakłady Inżynieryjne works, the series was to replace the ageing Polski Fiat 621 lorry in the service of the Polish Army. Serial production was to start in 1940, only a short pre-production series was completed before the invasion of Poland and the outbreak of World War II. After the war the original PZInż 703 served as the blueprint for the Star 20 truck, the first truck to be constructed by FSC Star.

== Variants ==
The PZInż 703 and its derivatives were to be available in several variants, depending on frame type, cab shape and engine. The PZInż works used their model numbers to identify the shape of the vehicle and two letter abbreviations to identify the engine and layout.

PZInż 703
Basic lorry model with engine in front of the cab. Available in BC and DC variants
PZInż 713
Shortened cab in cab over configuration; BC, DC and GC variants available
PZInż 723
Bus version, mostly identical to 713 except for the superstructure; BA, DA and GA variants available
