= FN-Kégresse 3T =

FN-Kégresse T3
- Type: half-track
- Place of origin: Belgium

Service history
- Used by: Belgium, Nazi Germany
- Wars: Second World War

Production history
- Designer: Minerva, FN Herstal and Citroën
- Designed: 1934
- Manufacturer: FN Herstal, Minerva
- Produced: 1934-1940
- No. built: 130
- Variants: 2

Specifications
- Mass: 4.05 ton
- Length: 5.130 m
- Width: 1900
- Height: 2120
- Crew: 2
- Armor: none
- Engine: Minerva 36 water-cooled 6-cylinder gasoline or FN63T water-cooled 8-cylinder gasoline 55 or 60 hp (41 or 45 kW)
- Power/weight: 13,6/14,8 hp per ton
- Transmission: 4 speed
- Suspension: frontal elliptical spring
- Operational range: 400 km
- Maximum speed: 45 km/h

The FN Kégresse 3T was a half-track vehicle used by the Belgian armed forces as an artillery tractor between 1934-40. The vehicle used the Kegresse track system and should not be confused with the Citroën Kégresse P14 half-track, part of the Citroën Kégresse family, which was also in use in the Belgian and Polish armed forces, but differs slightly in configuration. About 130 FN Kégresse were built by the start of the Battle of Belgium in May 1940.

== History ==
Looking for a way to mechanize the heavy equipment of the cavalry forces of the Belgian army, the Belgian supreme command became interested in the AMC Schneider P 16 half-track. However, given the protectionist economic climate of the early 1930s, a straightforward acquisition of the latter was eventually dropped. Instead a locally produced licensed derivative of the Citroën Kégresse P14 was decided upon: with the first prototype finished in 1934. Eventually the FN Kégresse 3T internal design and mechanics drew largely upon the design of the Minerva CM-3 lorry, since the mechanical parts and engine, a gasoline Minerva 36 six cylinder with 55 hp, were originally built in the Minerva factory. The chassis and outside features were largely similar to the Citroën Kégresse P14. FN Herstal had acquired the license to build the Kégresse half-track system, and took care of the final assembly.

However, given the low acquisition numbers of the original FN Kégresse 3T and the direct sale of Citroën Kégresse P14's to the Belgian armed forces the design clearly left something to be desired. So a second version was introduced with a slightly uprated 60 hp FN63T 8 cylinder gasoline engine, very similar to the one used in the FN63C lorry, by that time also in use with the Belgian army. Construction of the new model started in earnest by 1938.

== Description ==
The FN Kégresse 3T was a half-track with a two-man driver-cabin and a heavy platform equipped for towing large trailers or artillery pieces. Back suspension was of the Citroën Kégresse half-track type, with a leaf spring type suspension with 2 two-wheel bogies attached to a single sidebar, connected to the back idler-wheel, with only the frontal wheel providing traction. The frontal suspension was the same as used in the Minerva CM-3 truck and of the elliptical spring type. The engine of the first version of the FN Kégresse 3T was a water cooled 6 cylinder Minerva 36 gasoline engine with an internal volume of 3 litres and a power rating of 55 hp, the second version had a 4-litre FN 63T 8 cylinder water cooled gasoline engine producing 60 hp. As in the Minerva CM-3, the FN Kégresse 3T had a 4 speed transmission and an average autonomy of 400 km.

Similar to the Citroën Kégresse P14, there was a frontal winch drum installed in front of the front bumper, with a protruding hand crank access in the middle to start the engine. The winch was driven by motor power. Both on the sides as on the backside platform there were numerous storage compartments for small equipment, accessible from the outside. The driver cabin had a left sided steering wheel, and was open on both sides, with a simple cloth structure providing some protection against the elements. On a glance there is very little difference between the Citroën P14 Kégresse and the FN Kégresse 3T, apart from the rooftop of the drivers cabin, which is straight in the Citroën but is inclined forward in the FN Kégresse 3T as well as in the Minerva CM-3 it was based on. Different from the Minerva CM-3 was the placement of the spare tire: on the sides in the latter but on the FN Kégresse 3T it was placed on the rooftop. Neither version of the FN Kégresse 3T was armoured. They were unarmed except for the crew's individual weapons.

== Operational use ==
As the production of the second version started shortly before the second world war, the total amount produced remained rather limited: 130 FN Kégresse 3T's were built, with some 100 actually in use with the Belgian armed forces on 10 May 1940, the start of the Campaign in the west. Apart from a small amount of Citroën Kégresse P14's and some 300 fully tracked vehicles, these were the only tracked artillery tractors available to the Belgian armed forces. Wheeled vehicles were also used however: among others the CM-3, FN-63RMT, Latil and Brossel trucks, mostly for use in the cavalry regiments. Nevertheless, with a grand total of over 1200 mobile pieces of artillery (not including pieces in reserve, in fixed fortifications or railway guns), 222 anti-aircraft guns and over 750 anti-tank guns, the Belgian armed forces were for the larger part still heavily reliant on horse-drawn transport for their artillery. For example, 14A, the 14th artillery regiment, part of the first army corps of the Belgian army, only had 32 Kégresses for its 68 artillery pieces, with the remainder being horse drawn.

Compared to fully tracked vehicles, the half-track vehicles had a few clear advantages: production was relatively easy and cheap, since the independent left-right transmission and braking system of fully tracked vehicles could be disposed with; as in normal wheeled vehicles, steering was done with the front wheels. Maintenance requirements were smaller, but still fairly heavy compared to wheeled vehicles, with rubber tires for example having an endurance of some 80.000 km on average but tracks only some 10.000 km. Another advantage is that driver training is the same as for wheeled vehicles and thus quite short and easy. The most important and obvious drawback is less mobility in mud or sand. However, since Belgium had a relatively abundant and well developed asphalt road network, the latter issue was partly offset.

When the Battle of Belgium ended with the German occupation, all surviving and available FN Kégresse 3Ts, as well as all heavy and light armament and most of the motor vehicles, were requisitioned by the German army. But because the FN Herstal factory refused to cooperate with Nazi Germany and was subsequently looted and burnt down, spare parts were limited. However, given the large need for mechanized transport on the eastern front starting from 1941, the FN Kégresse 3T's were still used by the German army, under the designation "Minerva-FN-Kegresse bzw. Zugkraftwagen P 302 (b)".
