= Adolphe Kégresse =

French military engineer

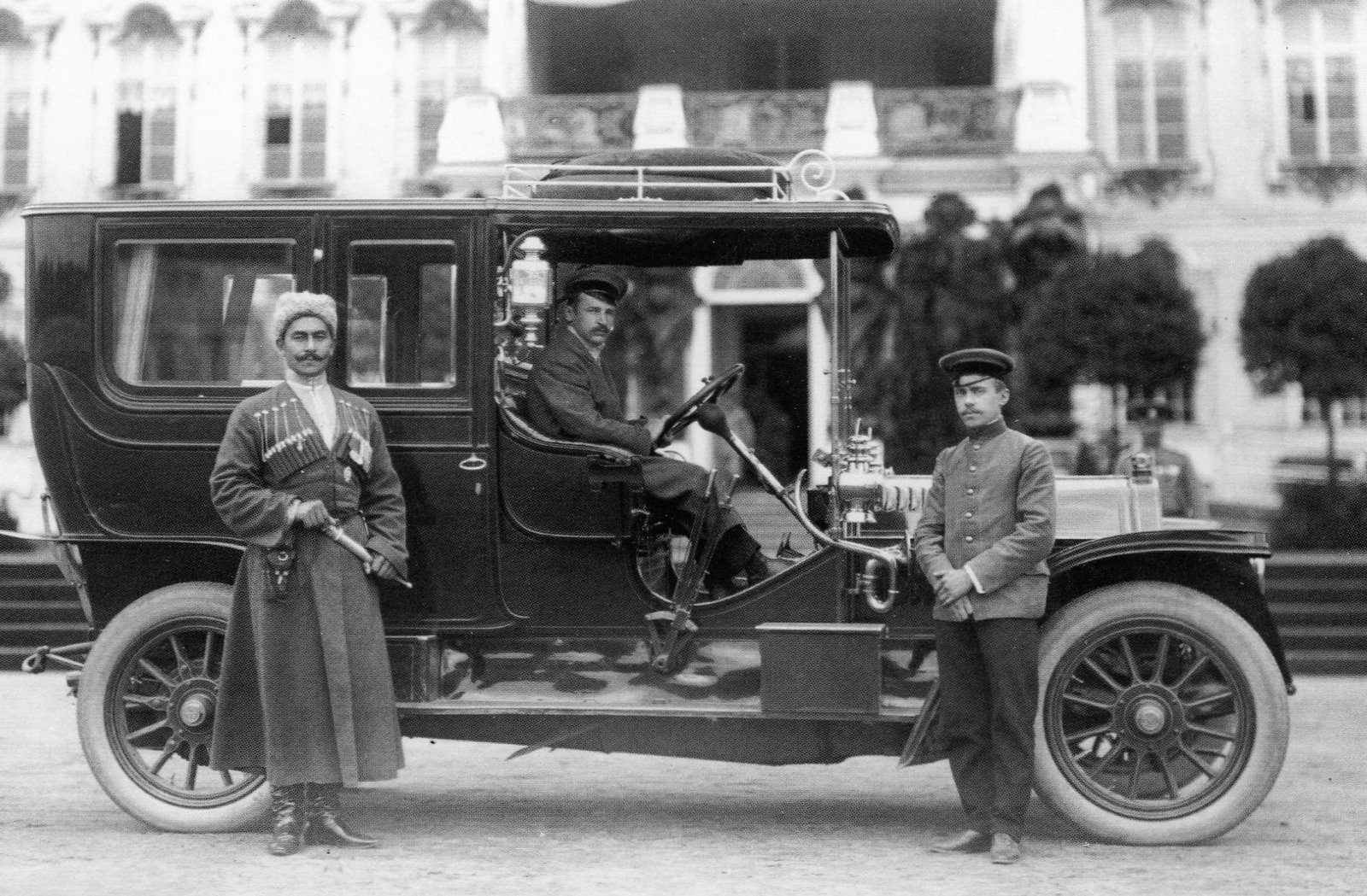
- Adolphe Kégresse seated behind the wheel of the Imperial "Benz". At the main entrance of Catherine Palace, Tsarskoye Selo, Russia, September 9, 1911.
- Born: 1879; Héricourt, Haute-Saône
- Died: 1943; Croissy-sur-Seine
- Engineering career
- Discipline: Military engineering
- Employer: Tsar Nicholas II
- Significant design: Half-track and dual clutch transmission

Adolphe Kégresse (1879, Héricourt, Haute-Saône – 1943) was a French military engineer who invented the half-track and dual clutch transmission.

Born at Héricourt, and educated in Montbéliard, he moved in 1905 to Saint Petersburg, Russia to work for the Russian Tsar Nicholas II. To improve the mobility of the imperial car park, he invented the Kégresse track to modify normal motor vehicles into half-tracks. He was also a personal chauffeur of Tsar Nicholas II and the Head of the Mechanical Department of the Russian Imperial Garage at Tsarskoye Selo. The Aide-de-camp to Tsar Nicholas II, Prince Orlov wrote in a letter to the Tsar's Minister of the Court on May 15, 1914:

"... I consider Kégresse an irreplaceable worker and I am afraid his leaving will be a great loss for the garage. Your Highness knows, of course, how much His Majesty appreciates Kégresse."

In 1908, the architect Lipsky VA designed a second two-storeyed Art Nouveau building for the Russian Imperial garage at Tsaskoye Selo / Pushkin, Saint Petersburg it had a total area of 367.6 sq. M. It housed the garage-residence Adolphe Kégresse. The building is noteworthy and identifiable for inclusion of a grand staircase with an external bas-relief image of one of the first car races held regularly in Tsarskoe Selo before the First World War.

After World War I Kégresse was forced to return to his home country, where he was from 1919 employed by the Citroën company during the 1920s and 1930s to design half-track vehicles, together with engineer Jacques Hinstin.

After leaving the Citroën company he developed in 1935 the AutoServe gearbox-transmission system. In 1939 he pioneered the development of modern small guided tracked bombs. Kégresse died in 1943 at Croissy-sur-Seine.

== Gallery ==
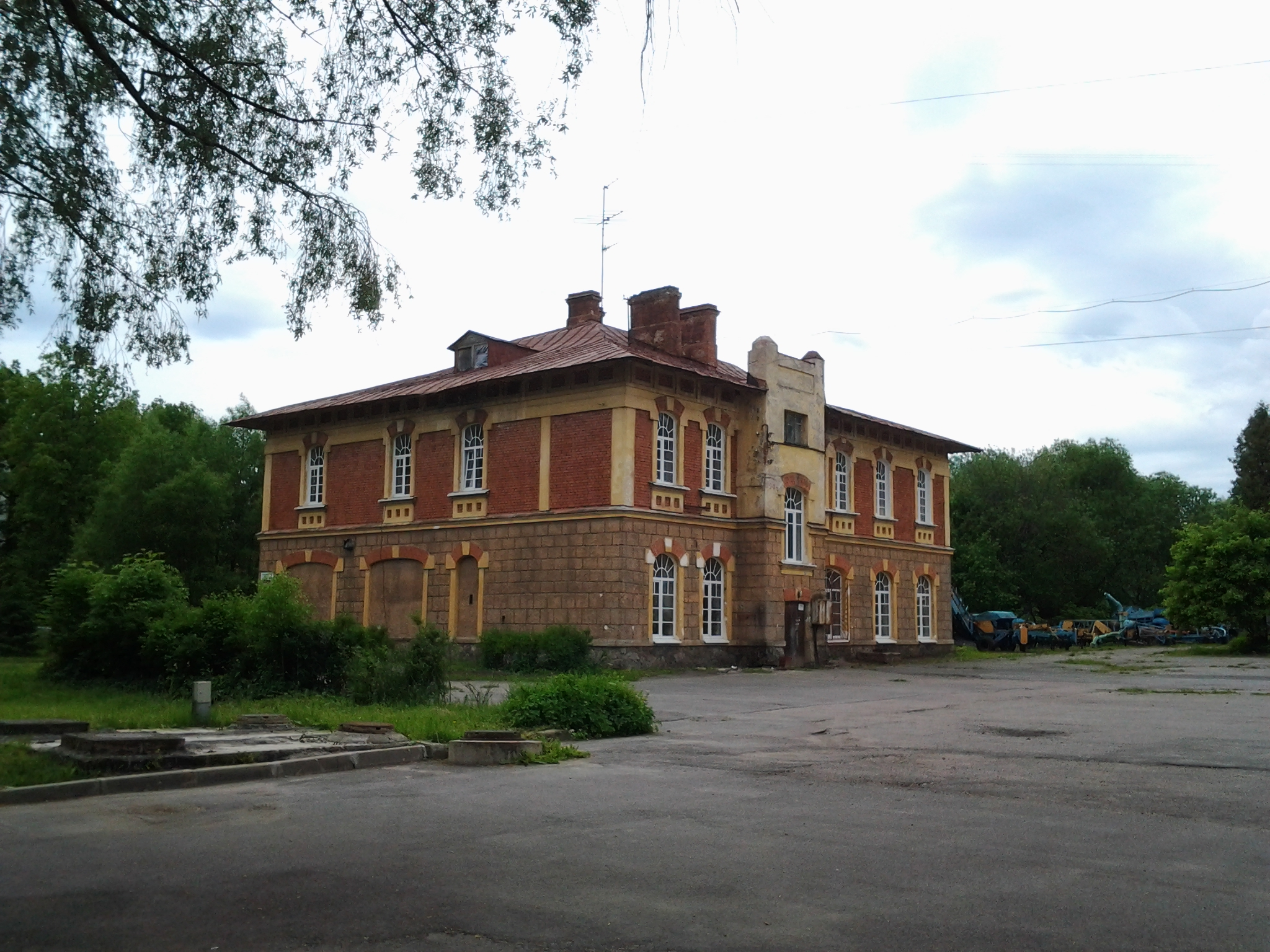
Tsar Nicholas II Car Garages, Pushkin, Saint Petersburg where Kégresse was Head of the Mechanical Department

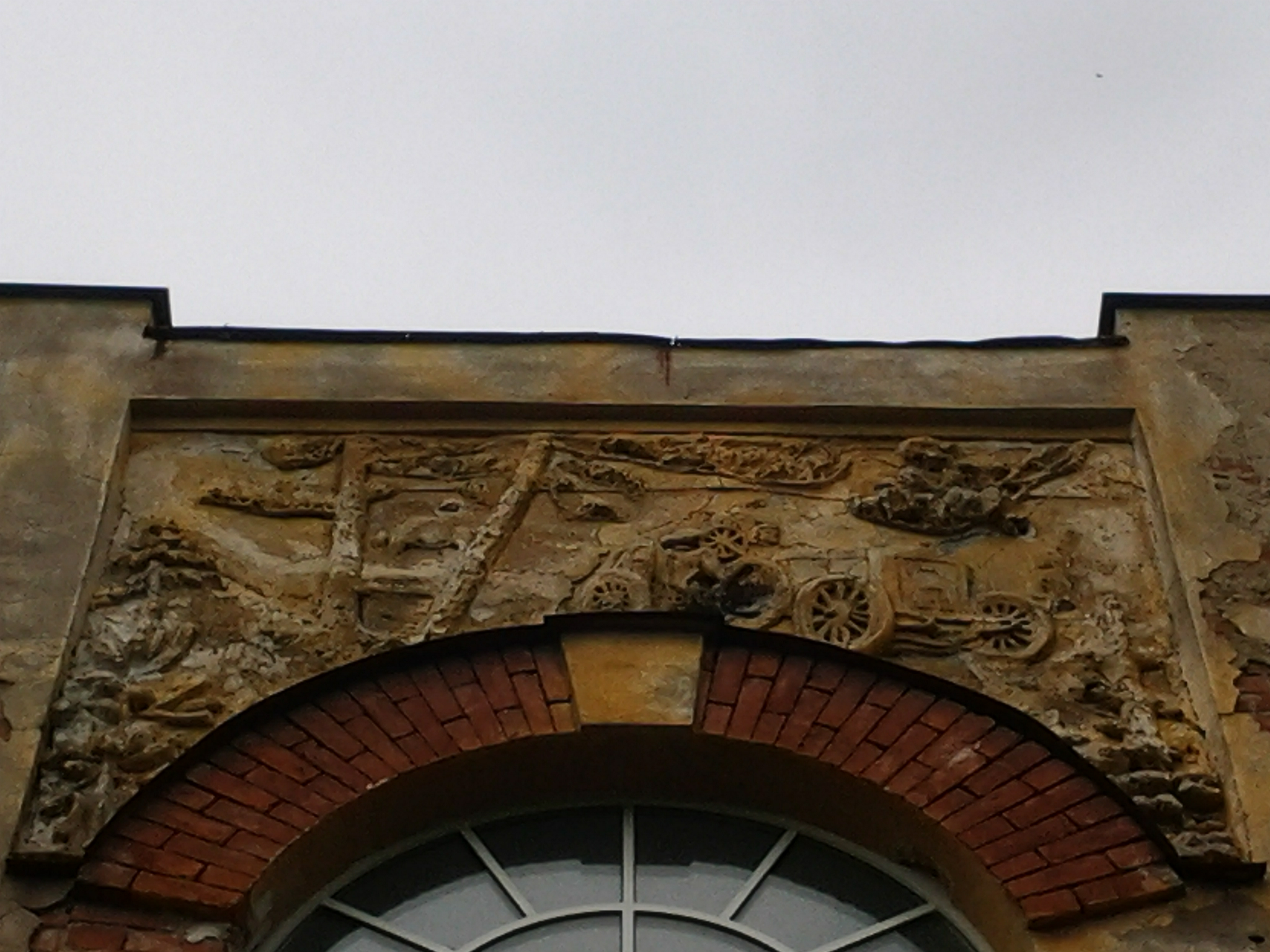
bas-relief image of a car race, Tsar Nicholas II Car Garages, Pushkin, Saint Petersburg

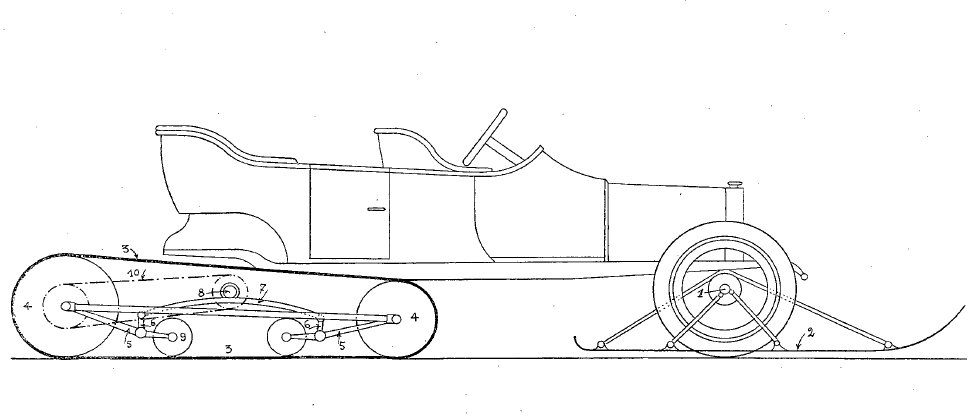
Kégresse's 1913 design

Kégresse track 1914–18 at Tsar Nicholas II Car Garages, Pushkin, Saint Petersburg

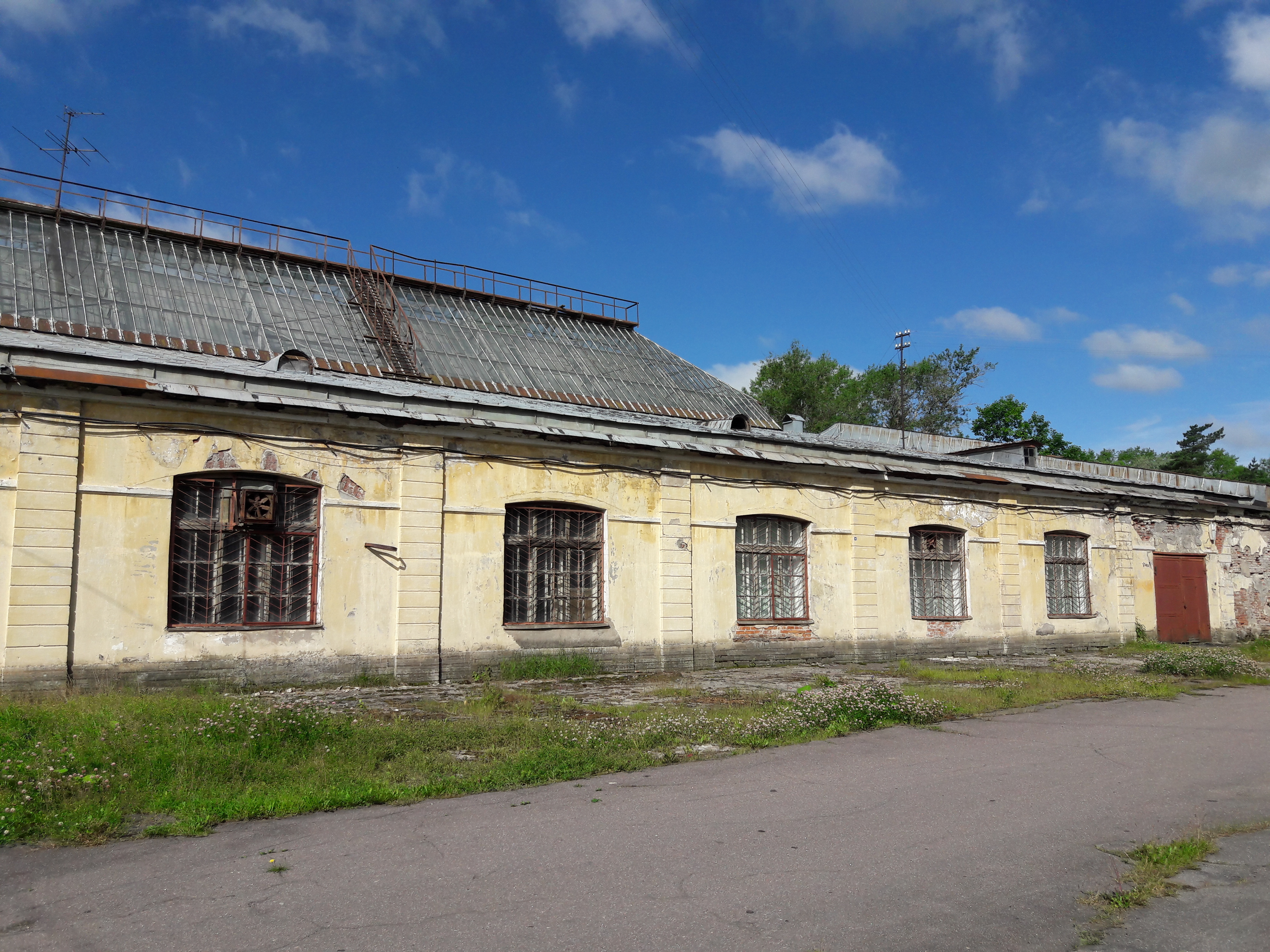
Former Tsar Nicholas II Car Garages, Pushkin, Saint Petersburg in July 2017

Kégresse Track 1914–18 at Tsar Nicholas II Car Garages, Pushkin, Saint Petersburg

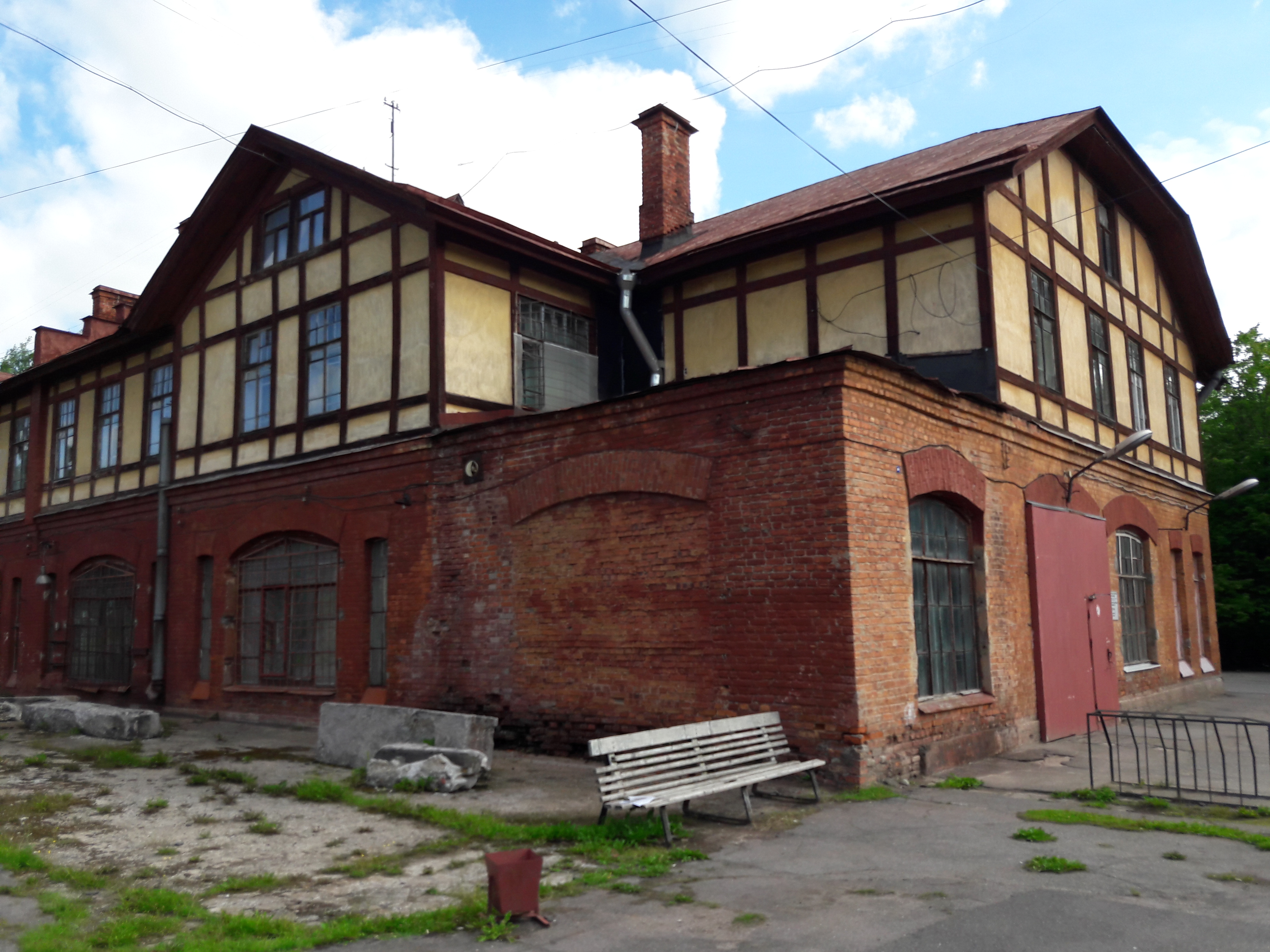
Former Tsar Nicholas II Car Garages, Pushkin, Saint Petersburg in July 2017

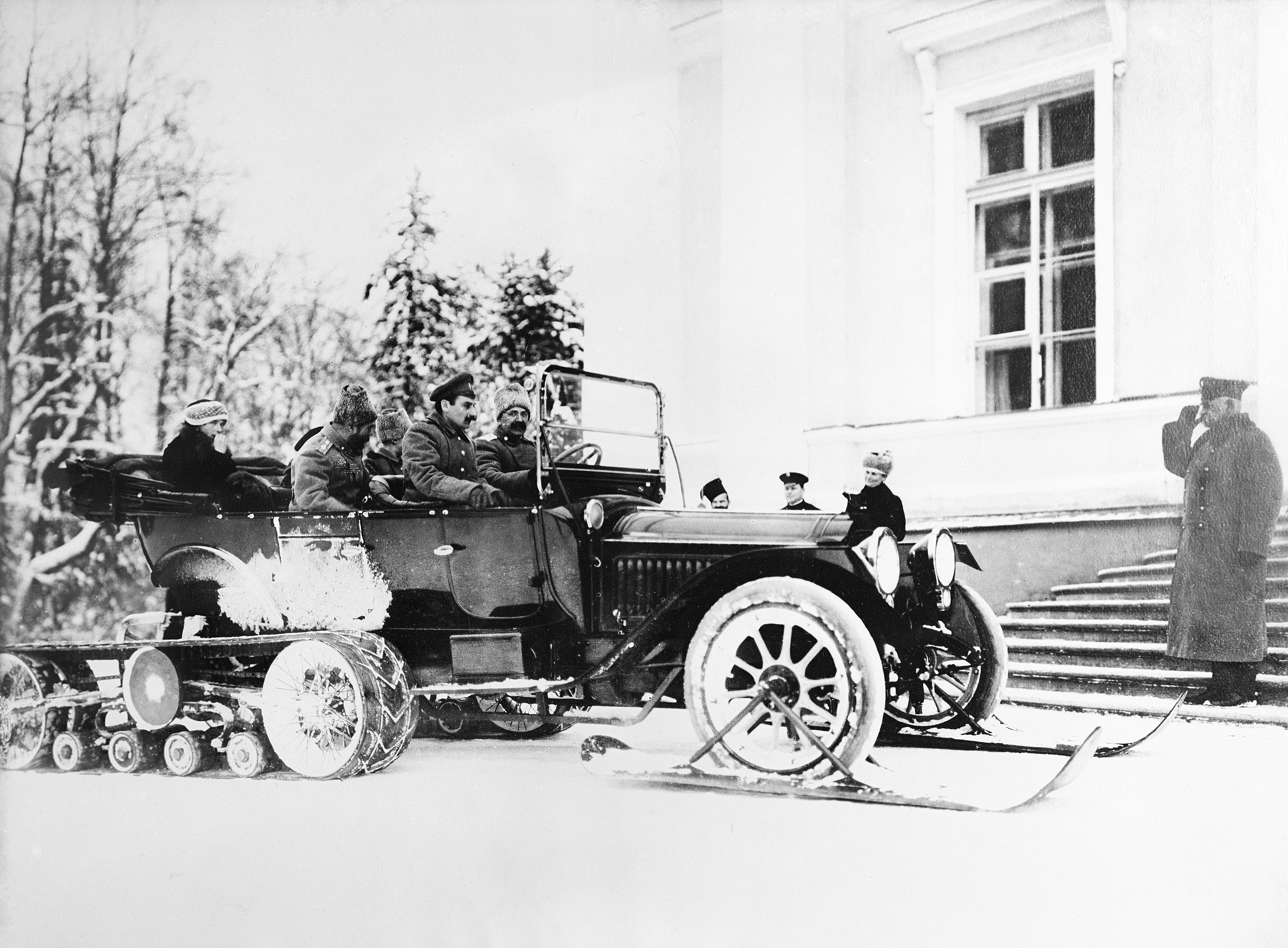
Kégresse Track outside Alexander Palace, Tsarskoye Selo, January 1917

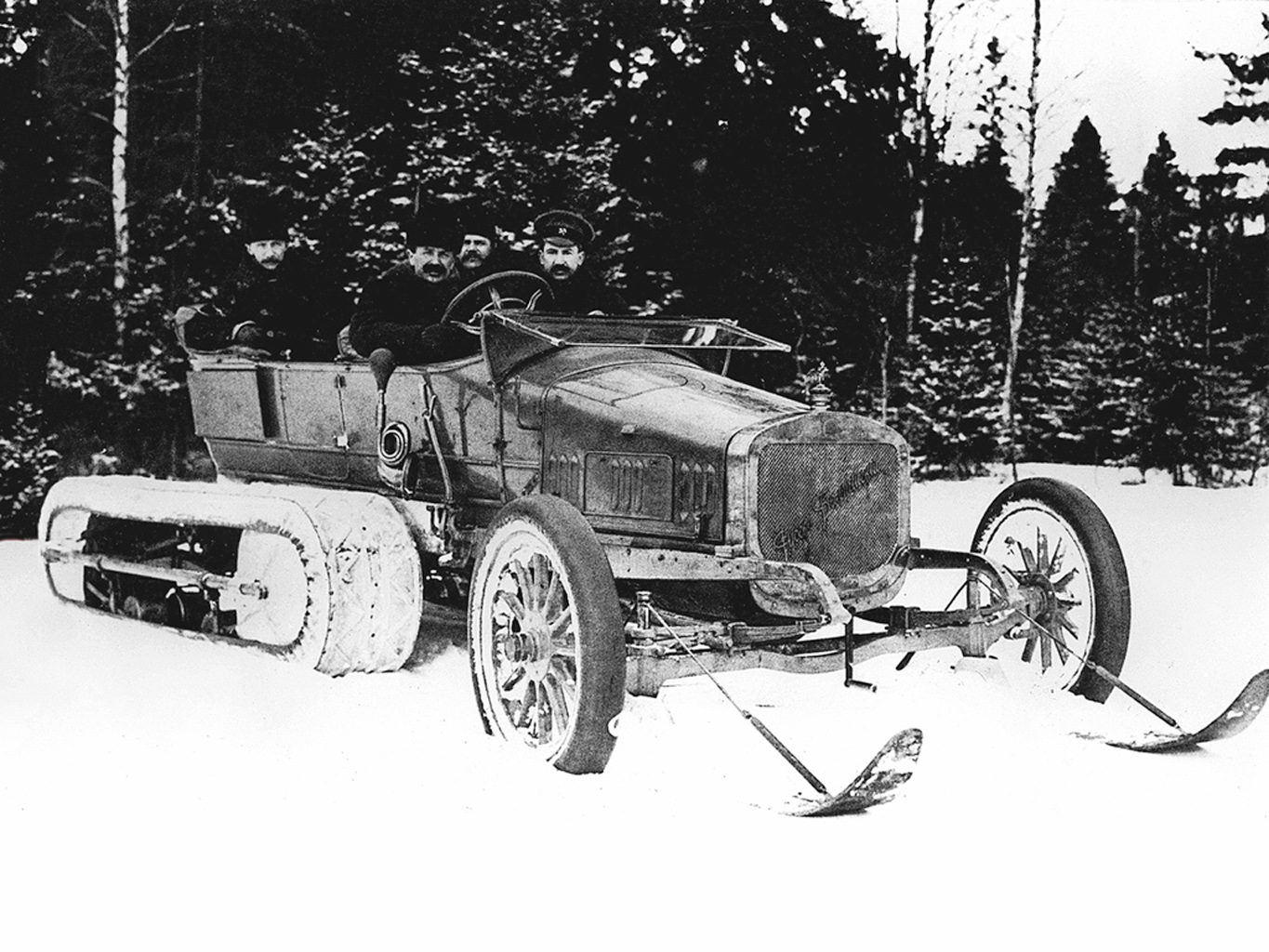
"Russo-Balt "C24-30" from the garage of Tsar Nicholas II with Kégresse track design of Adolphe Kégresse. Adolphe Kégresse possibly seated on the right of the photograph

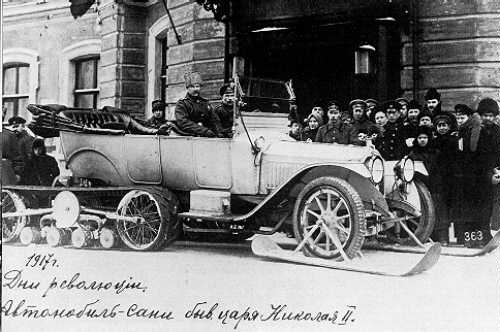
A Packard Twin-6 car with Kégresse track from the personal car park of the Tsar Nicholas II

Russia 1914

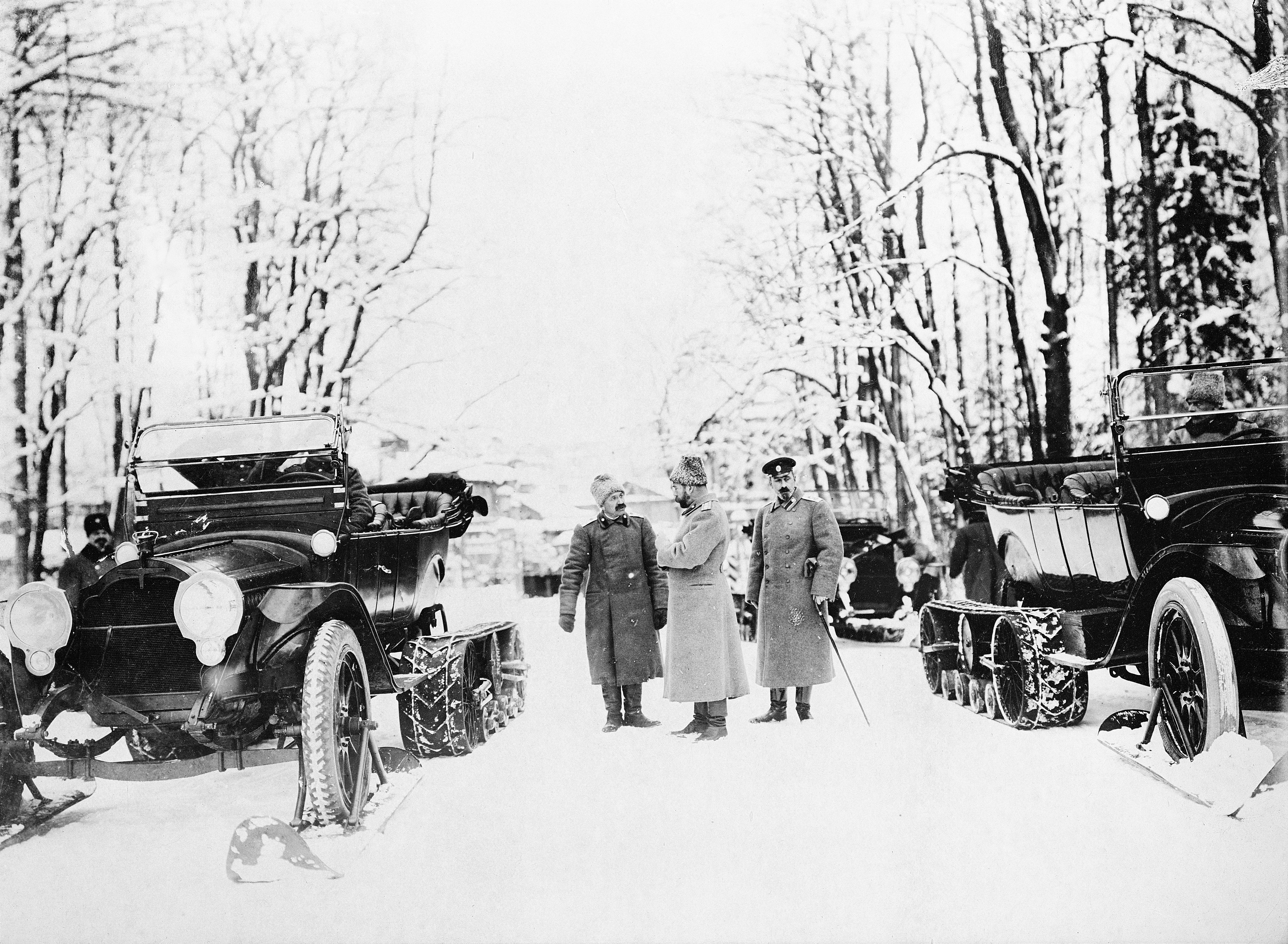
Russia 1914

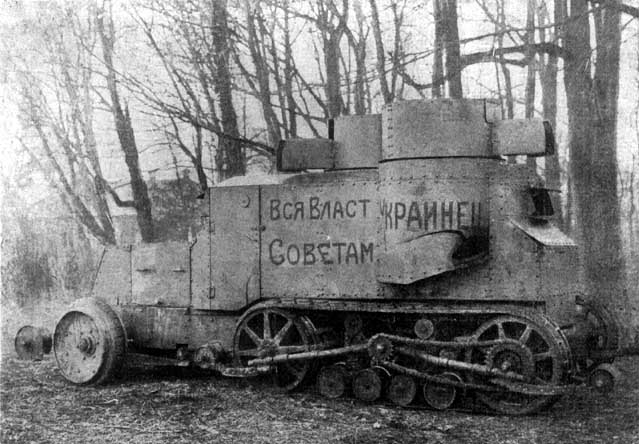
An Austin-Putilov Armoured Car with Kégresse tracks of the Red Army which was damaged during the Polish–Soviet War. In the area of Zhytomyr, 21 March 1920

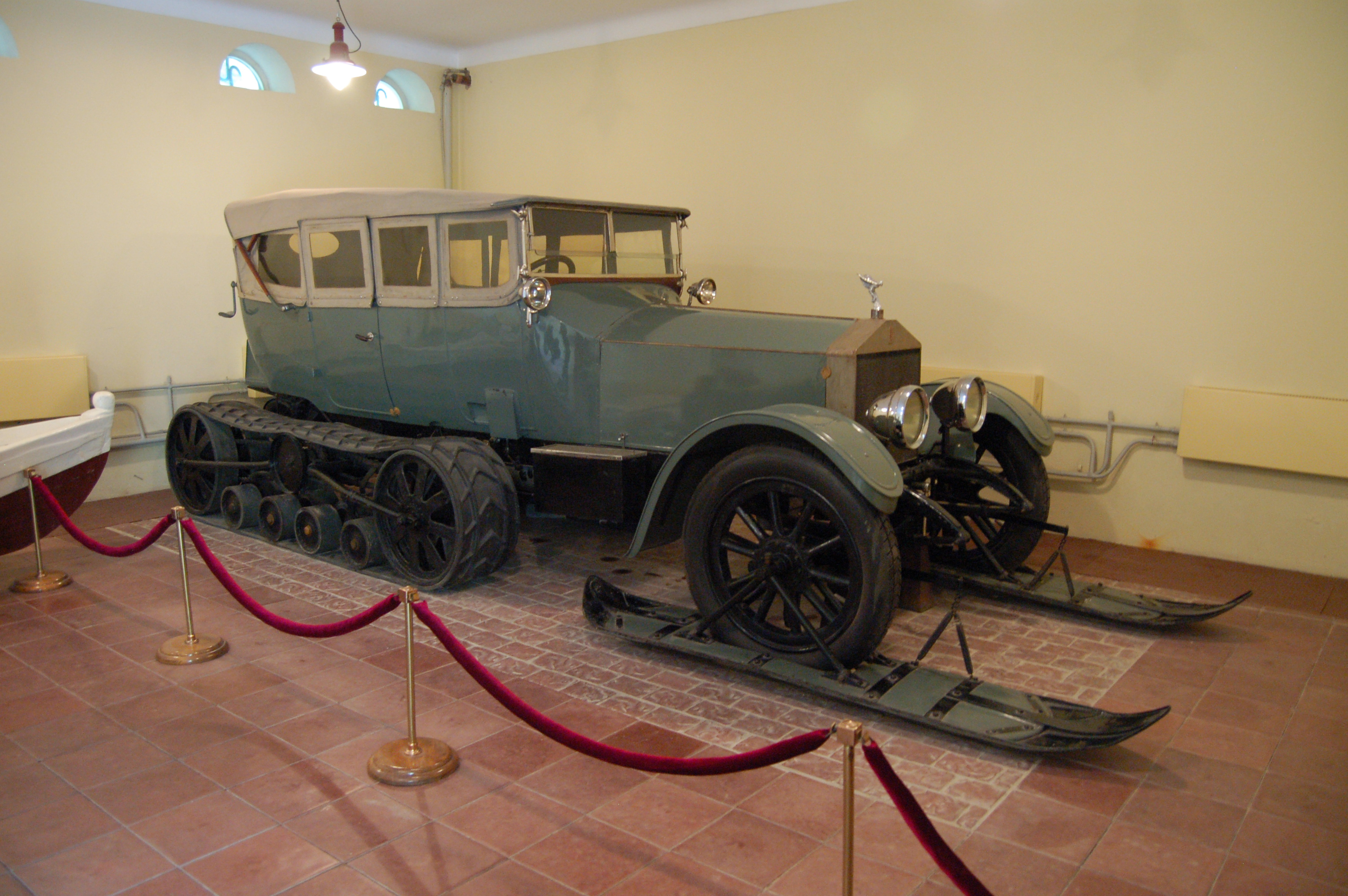
Lenin's Rolls-Royce Silver Ghost with Kégresse track, converted by the Putilov plant, at Gorki Leninskiye

== See also ==
- Kégresse track
- AMC Schneider P 16
- SOMUA MCG
