= AMC Schneider P 16 =

French half-track armored car

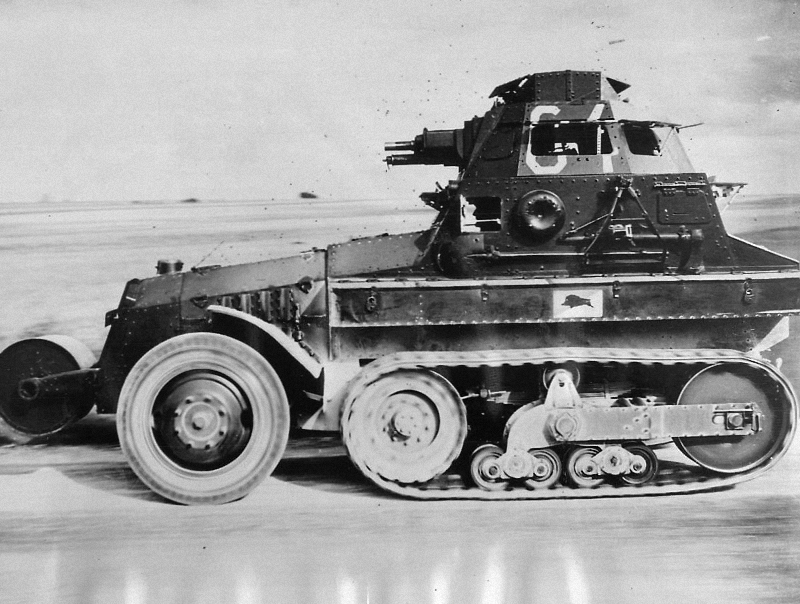
- Type: Half-track
- Place of origin: France

Production history
- Designer: Citroën-Kégresse
- Designed: 1924
- Manufacturer: Schneider
- Produced: 1928-1931
- No. built: 100
- Variants: Modèle 28

Specifications
- Mass: 6.8 t (6.7 long tons)
- Length: 4.83 m (15 ft 10 in)
- Width: 1.75 m (5 ft 9 in)
- Height: 2.60 m (8 ft 6 in)
- Crew: 3
- Armour: 11.4 mm (0.45 in)
- Main armament: 37 mm SA 18 gun
- Secondary armament: 7.5 Reibel machine gun
- Engine: Panhard 17; 60 hp (45 kW)
- Suspension: Kégresse track
- Fuel capacity: 125 litres
- Operational range: 250 km
- Maximum speed: 50 km/h

The AMC Schneider P 16, also known as the AMC Citroën-Kégresse Modèle 1929 or the Panhard-Schneider P16, was a half-track that was designed for the French Army before World War II.

== Development ==
The P 16 was developed in 1924 by Citroën from the earlier Citroën-Kégresse Modèle 1923, one of the models applying the Kégresse track. It was very similar in conception but had an enlarged armoured hull, built by Schneider, and a stronger 60 hp Panhard engine. In June 1925 an order was obtained for a pre-series of four vehicles. In October that year a first production series of ten is ordered. Citroën found itself unable to produce the vehicles and the order was delegated to Schneider. Citroën would supply the chassis, Kégresse the suspension and Schneider, responsible for the final assembly, the armour plates.

The pre-series vehicles get the company designation Modèle 1928 or M 28 after the year they were delivered; the production vehicles are likewise named Modèle 1929 or M 29, though the actual delivery was in 1930 and 1931. The official name however, assigned in 1931, is the AMC Schneider P 16. The P 16 was thus accepted as conforming to the specifications for a wheeled AMC, or an AMC N°1, as stated by the Supreme Command on 12 April 1923, although the vehicle was not specifically designed to meet them, and partially fulfilling the requirements of an AMC N°2 stated in August 1924, which asked for a tracked vehicle — as a half-track it was indeed in between. "AMC" stands for Automitrailleuse de Combat. Although automitrailleuse is today a synonym for "armoured car", in those days it was the codename for any Cavalry armoured vehicle. In fact their rôle was pretty much that of a main battle tank as the Cavalry would not acquire real modern guntanks until 1935; in the twenties fully tracked vehicles were, given the state of technological development, considered by the Cavalry as being too slow. "P 16" refers to the Panhard 16 engine. Confusingly, the pre-series vehicles only were fitted with it, while the production vehicles have the Panhard 17. In total 96 vehicles of the main series were produced, serial numbers from the range 37002 - 37168, resulting in a total of 100 vehicles.

== Export plans ==
The AMC Schneider P 16 has never been exported. However, in July 1930 the Belgian supreme command considered the acquisition of the type in the context of a Cavalry mechanisation programme. They envisaged the fitting of a specially to be developed Belgian high velocity FRC 47 mm gun to give it a far superior antitank-capacity. Eventually they decided against obtaining half-tracks and instead bought the French AMC 35 tank to be the recipient of the Belgian 47 mm gun.

== Description ==
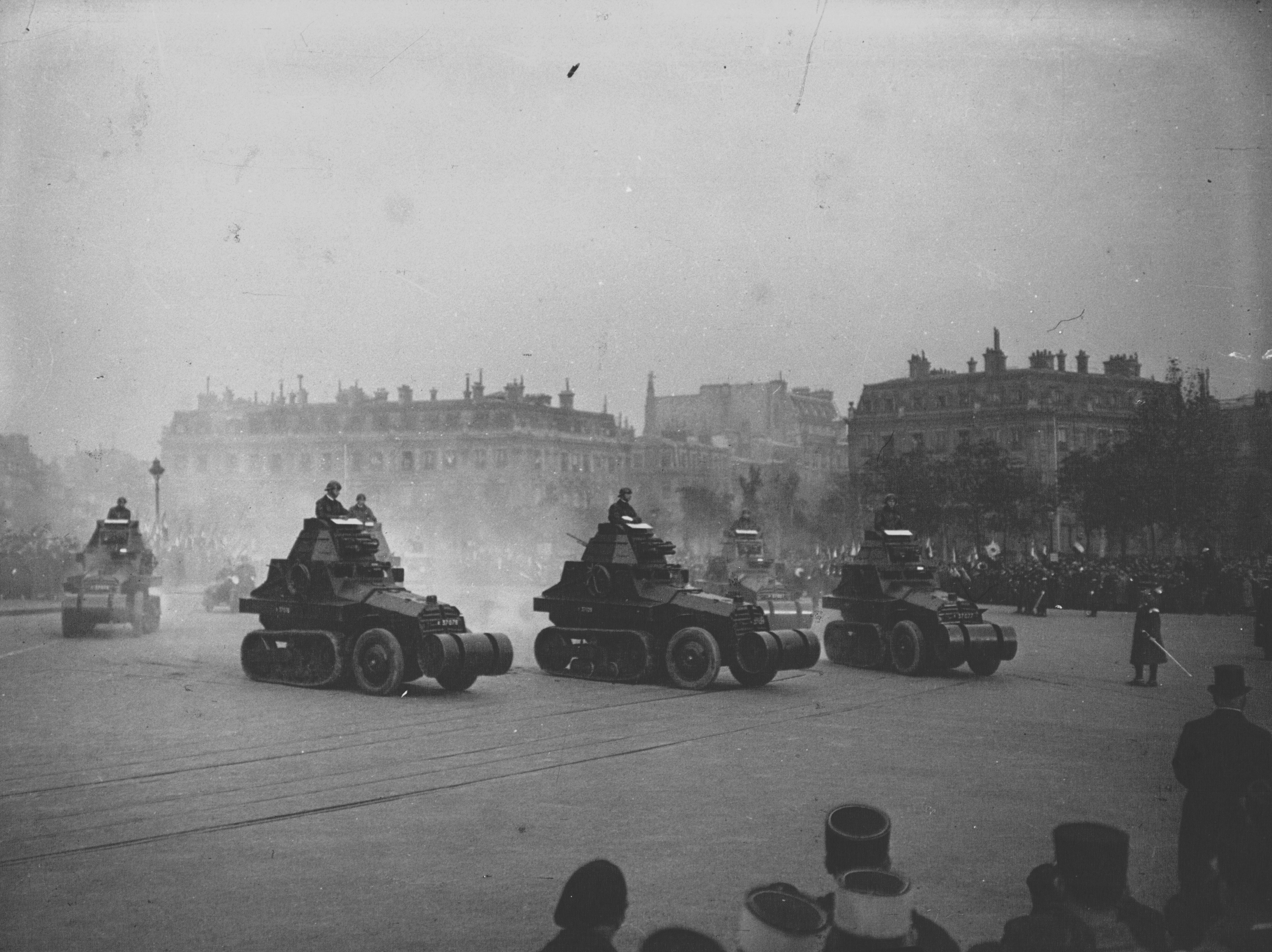
P 16 armored cars in Paris during November 11th ceremonies, 1934

The AMC Schneider P 16 is a small vehicle, 483 centimetres long, 175 cm wide and 260 cm high. As the maximum armour thickness is only 11.4 mm, the weight is accordingly low, 6.8 metric tonnes. Combined with a four-cylinder 3178 cc 60 hp engine in the nose of the vehicle this results in a high maximum speed for the period, of 50 km/h. A fuel tank of 125 litres allows for a range of 250 kilometres. The trench crossing capacity is 40 centimetres, a slope of 40% can be climbed.

The P16 employs a Kégresse half-track drive developed by Citroën-Kégresse, without power transfer to the steerable front wheels. The track does not have real links, but consists of an internal steel band, embedded in rubber. The large sprocket is in front; behind it a central axle is located in the middle, on which rotates a section with two bogies, each holding two small road wheels, and a long double beam to the back, holding a large trailing wheel. Above the axle is a single top roller supporting the track. There was a crew of three: the commander in the turret and two drivers in the hull, the second facing the back in order to drive the half-track in that direction immediately when ambushed. This "dual drive" feature is typical for a reconnaissance vehicle.

In the M 28 an octagonal turret is placed on top of an octagonal fighting compartment; the turret has a short SA 16 37 mm gun in front and a "8 mm" Hotchkiss machine-gun (which had in fact a calibre of 7.92 mm) in the back. Small drums in front of each front wheel help to climb obstacles.

The M 29 has a changed configuration. The fighting compartment is square and the machine gun, now a 7.5 mm "Reibel", is co-axial with the gun in the front of the turret. The small drums are replaced with three of a very large diameter, the widest in the middle, allowing to climb a 50 cm obstacle. There are hundred rounds for the 37 mm gun; sixty HE and forty AP; three thousand rounds for the MAC 31: 1950 or thirteen magazines standard bullets and 1050 or seven magazines AP-bullets; the 7,5 mm "Reibel" had a maximum armour penetration of about 12 mm.

== Operational history ==
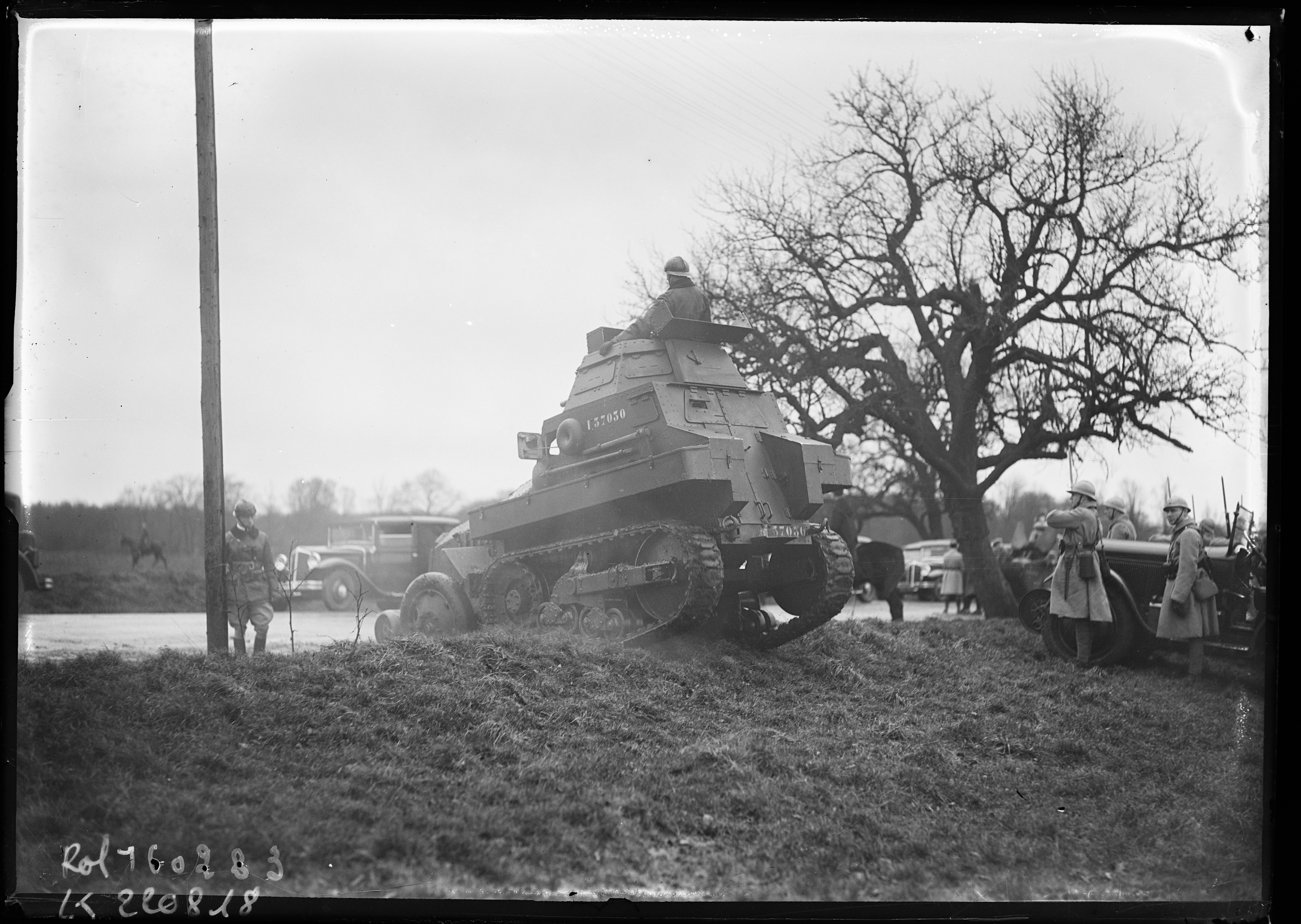
A P 16 during maneuvers in Satory in 1932

The P 16s first served in eight of the autonomous Escadrons de Automitrailleuses de Combat (EAMCs), which in 1932 were allocated to four of the five Cavalry Divisions. Later they were used by the 1er Division Légère Mécanique (DLM or mechanised light division), France's first armoured division, as main battle vehicles until being replaced by the SOMUA S35 from 1937. Fourteen were then transferred to the 2e Régiment de Chasseurs d'Afrique in Tunisia and the remainder to the Infantry divisions who deployed them as Automitrailleuse de Reconnaissance (AMR, a term indicating a support AFV for motorised infantry, not a pure reconnaissance vehicle) in the Groupes de Reconnaissance de Division d'Infantrie, the reconnaissance units, provided by the Cavalry, of the motorised infantry divisions: 1er GRDI, 3e GRDI, 4e GRDI, 6e GRDI and 7e GRDI each had during the Battle of France a nominal strength of sixteen (four platoons of three in their Groupe d'Escadrons de Reconnaissance or GER, and a reserve of four) for a total of eighty. In reality the number was lower: on 2 September 1939 these units had 74 P 16's and on 10 May this had dropped to 54: eight at the 1er GRDI; twelve at the 3e GRDI; nine at the 4e GRDI; a maximum of thirteen at the 6e GRDI and twelve at the 7e GRDI; in the last two units they were part of two mixed AMR/AMD squadrons. Sixteen were at that moment in repair or used for driver training, 22 were listed in the general matériel reserve — these had in fact broken down and were considered beyond repair. Some GRDIs accommodated by reducing the number of P 16 platoons from four to three. In the Infantry Arm the type was known as the AMR Schneider P 16.

All vehicles of the type were by this time completely worn out and close to being phased out in favour of light Hotchkiss tanks. Of some units the crews had already departed to be retrained in the use of the tank and had to be hastily recalled when the invasion came. They nevertheless fought with some effectiveness against the invading forces: e.g. on 14 May two P 16's of 1er GRDI were crucial in retaking Haut-le-Wastia from German infantry belonging to 5th Panzer Division. Due to the long distances the motorised divisions had to cover, most P 16's eventually had to be abandoned after a mechanical breakdown.

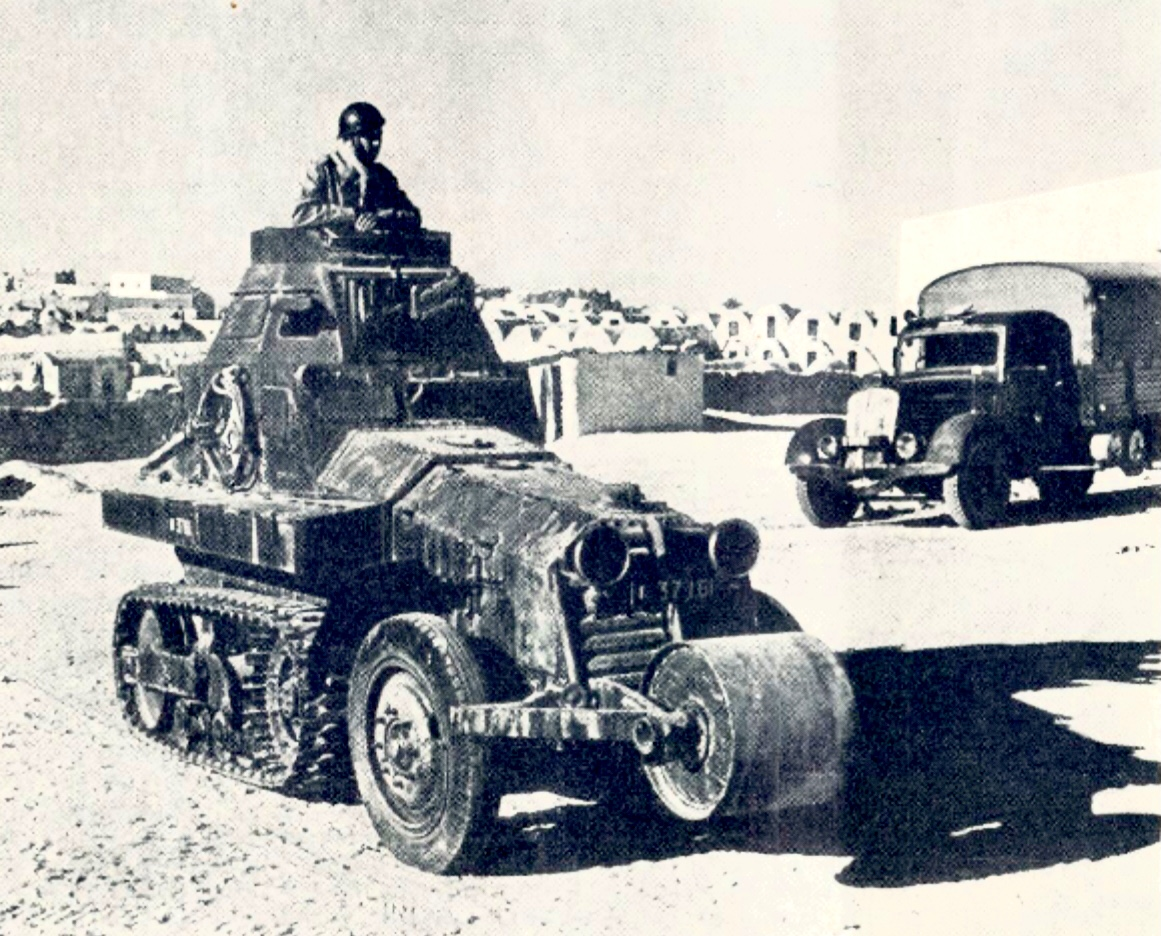
A P 16 in Tunisia in 1940

After the armistice the vehicles in North-Africa were allowed to be used by the French units there, but were transferred to 5e Régiment de Chasseurs d'Afrique in Algiers. Eleven had in March 1940 already been transferred to the 2e RCAP (Régiment de Chasseurs d'Afrique Portés) of the 6e DLC (Division Légère de Cavalerie). The Germans seem not to have taken into use any captured P 16's.

There are no known surviving AMC Schneider P 16 vehicles.

== Literature ==
- François Vauvillier, 2005, Les Matériels de l'Armée Française 2: Les Automitrailleuses de Reconnaissance tome 2: L'AMR 35 Renault — ses concurrentes et ses dérivées, Histoire & Collections, Paris
- Leland Ness (2002) Jane's World War II Tanks and Fighting Vehicles: The Complete Guide, HarperCollins, London and New York, ISBN 0-00-711228-9
- Pierre Touzin, Les véhicules blindés français, 1900-1944, EPA, 1979
- Pierre Touzin, Les Engins Blindés Français 1920-1945, Volume 1, SERA, 1976
