= Kégresse track =

Continuous track consisting of a flexible belt rather than interlocking metal segments

A Kégresse track is a kind of rubber or canvas continuous track that uses a flexible belt rather than interlocking metal segments. It can be fitted to a conventional car or truck to turn it into a half-track, suitable for use over rough or soft ground. Conventional front wheels and steering are used, although skis may also be fitted. A snowmobile is a smaller ski-only type.

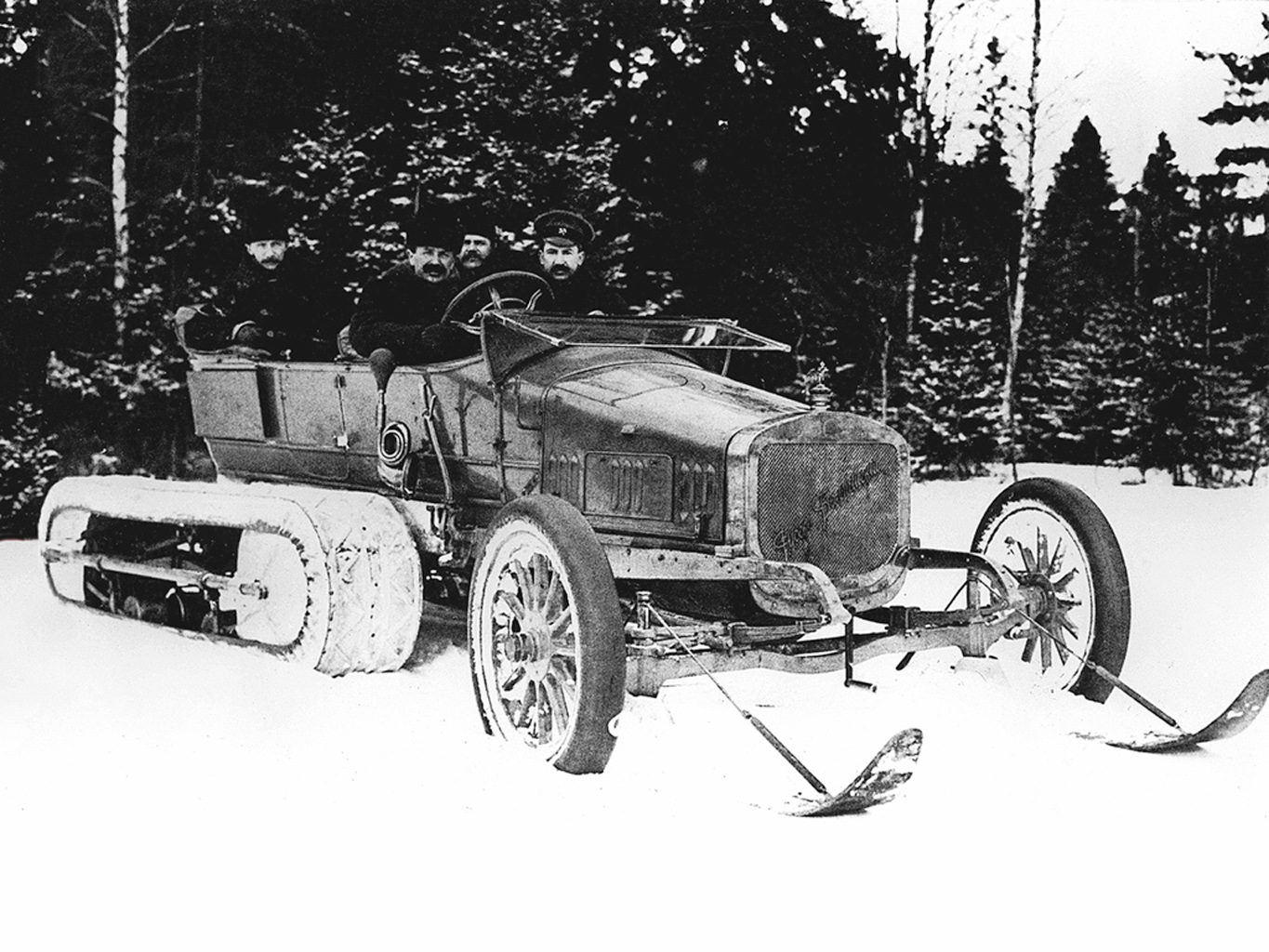
"Russo-Balt" "C24-30" from the garage of Tsar Nicholas II with Kégresse track. Adolphe Kégresse possibly seated on the right of the photograph

The mechanism incorporates an articulated bogie, fitted to the rear of the vehicle with a large drive wheel at one end, a large unpowered idler wheel at the other, and several small guide wheels in between, over which runs a reinforced flexible belt. The belt is fitted with metal or rubber treads to grip the ground.

== History ==
=== Russia ===
Adolphe Kégresse designed the original system whilst working for Tsar Nicholas II of Russia as a chauffeur and as the head of the royal garage between 1906 and 1917. He applied it to several cars including a Russo-Balt and a 12-cylinder Packard. After 1917, Putilov Ironworks also fitted the system to a number of Austin Armoured and Rolls Royce cars.

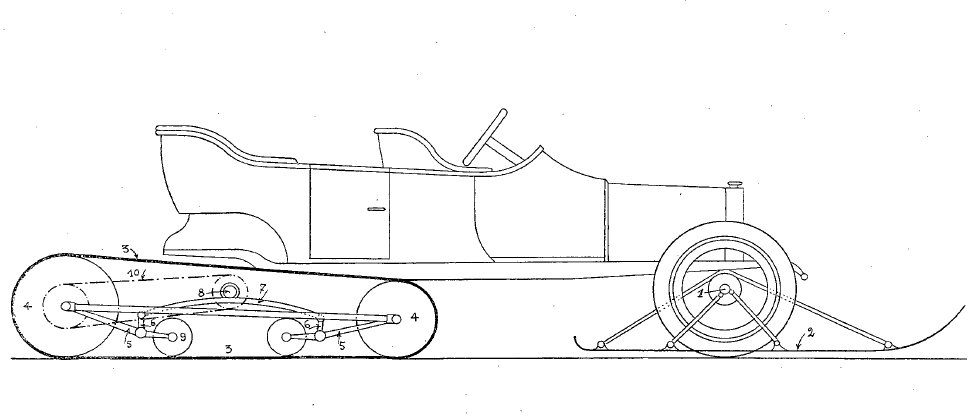
Patent drawing of Kégresse half-track CH65643 (1913)

Kégresse 1914-18 at Tsar Nicholas II Car Garages, Pushkin, Saint Petersburg

Kégresse 1914-18 at Tsar Nicholas II Car Garages, Pushkin, Saint Petersburg

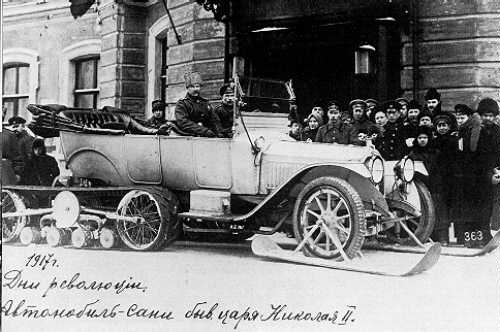
Russian imperial state limousine, 1916 Packard Twin-Six touring car, equipped with Kégresse track (1917)

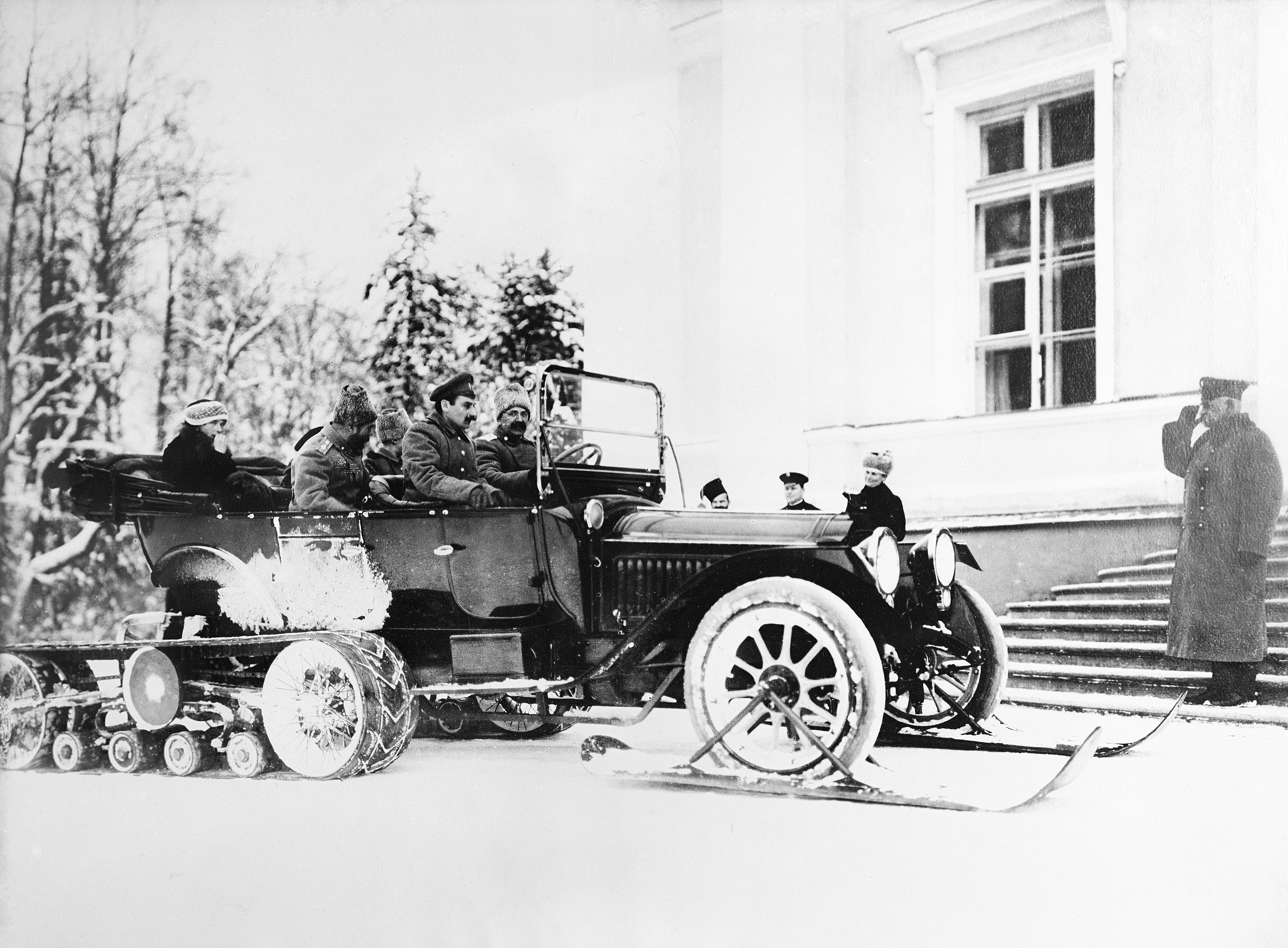
Kégresse outside Alexander Palace, Tsarskoye Selo, Russia, January 1917

Russia 1914

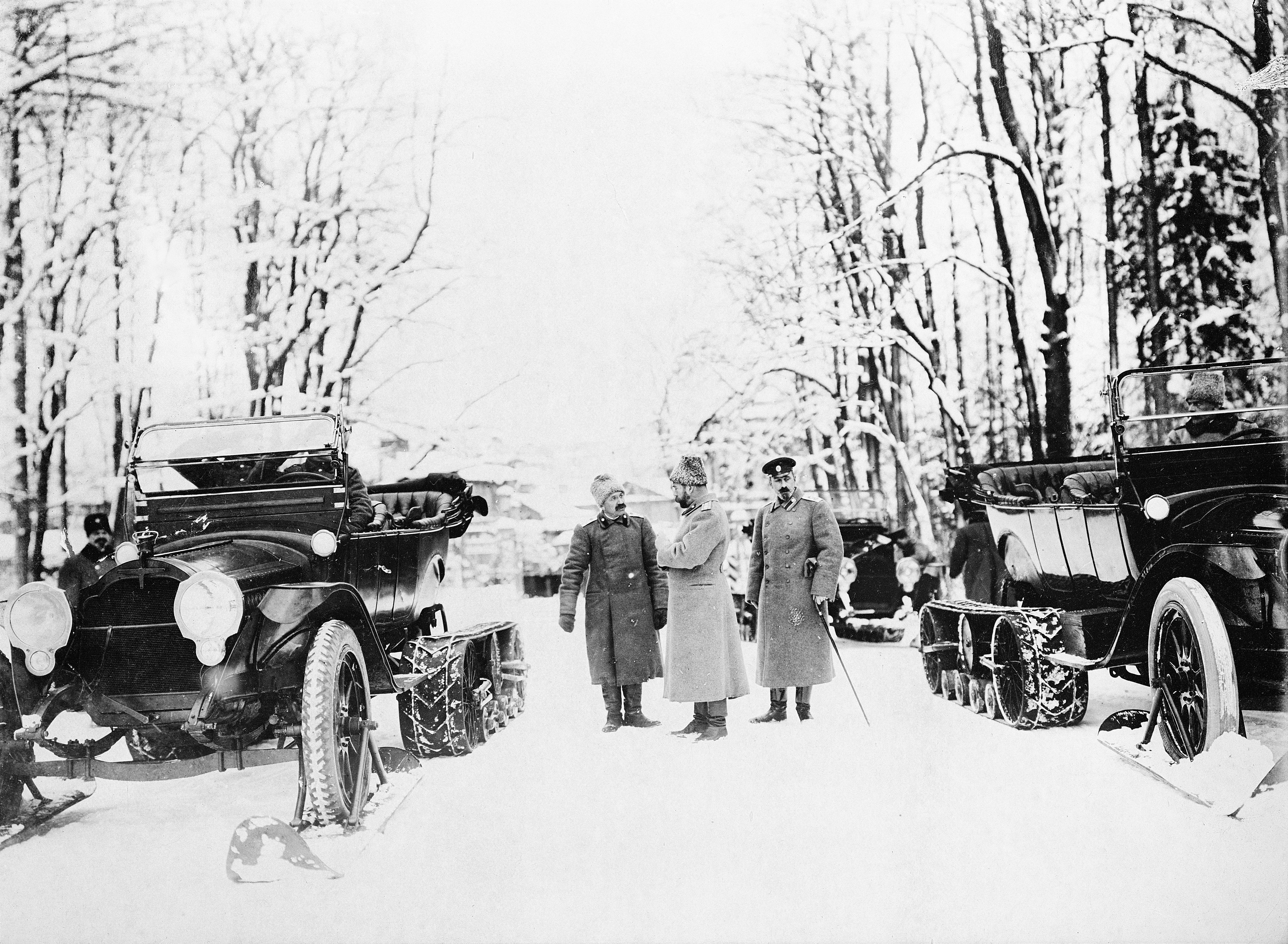
Russia 1914

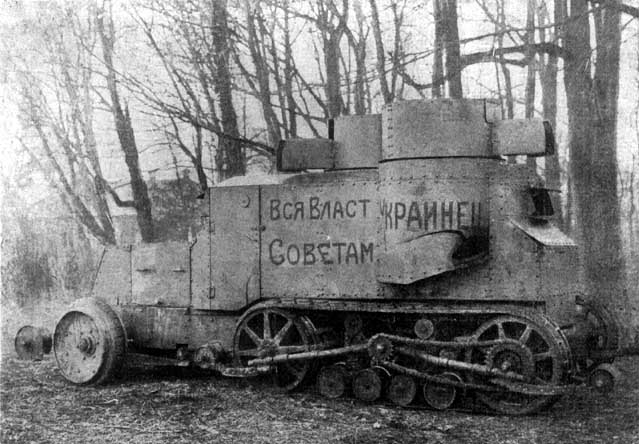
A Red Army Austin-Putilov Armoured Car damaged near Zhytomyr during the Polish–Soviet War, 21 March 1920

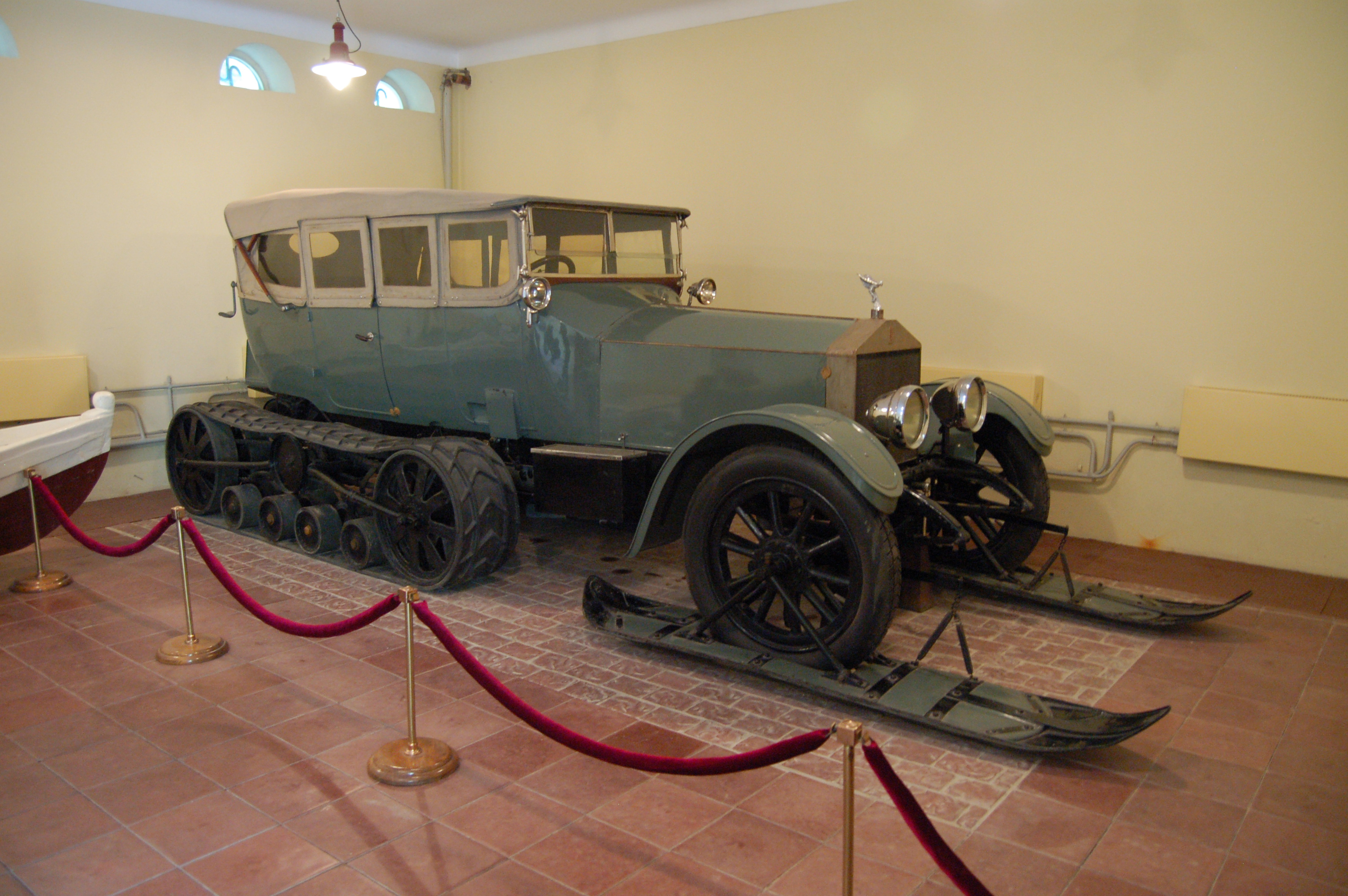
Lenin's Rolls-Royce Silver Ghost with Kégresse track, converted by the Putilov plant, Gorki Leninskiye

=== France ===
Following the Russian Revolution, Kégresse returned to his native France, where the system was used on Citroën cars between 1921 and 1937 for off-road and military vehicles. Expeditions across undeveloped parts of Asia, America, and Africa were undertaken by Citroën, demonstrating all-terrain capabilities.

During World War II, the Wehrmacht captured many Citroën half-track vehicles and armored them for their own use.

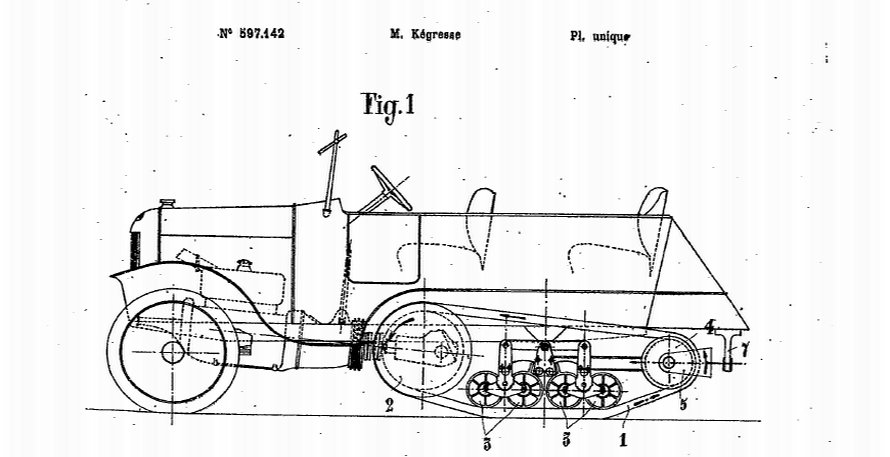
Patent drawing of Kégresse system FR597142 (1924)

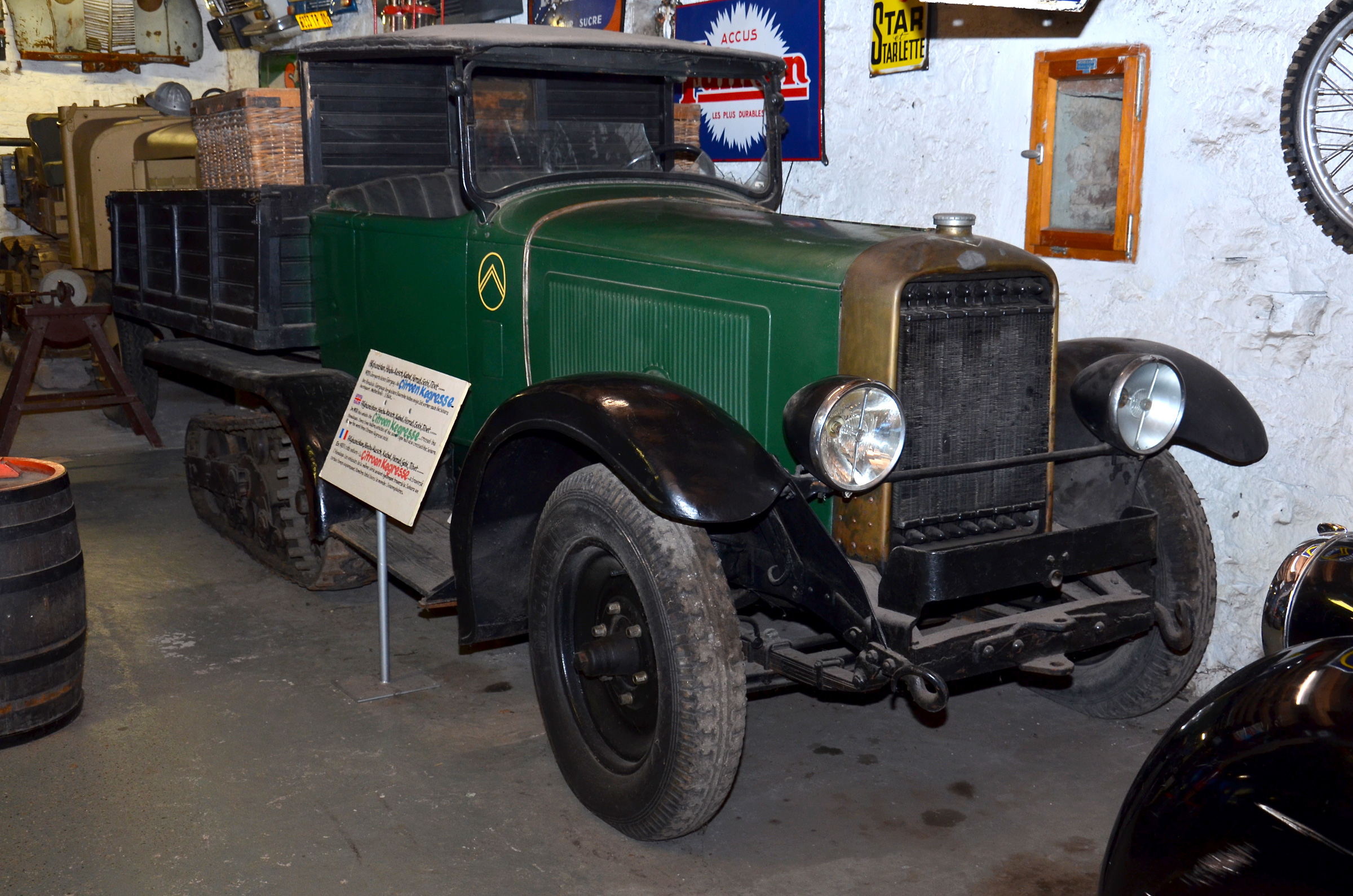
Citroën Kégresse in the Marxzell Museum, Germany

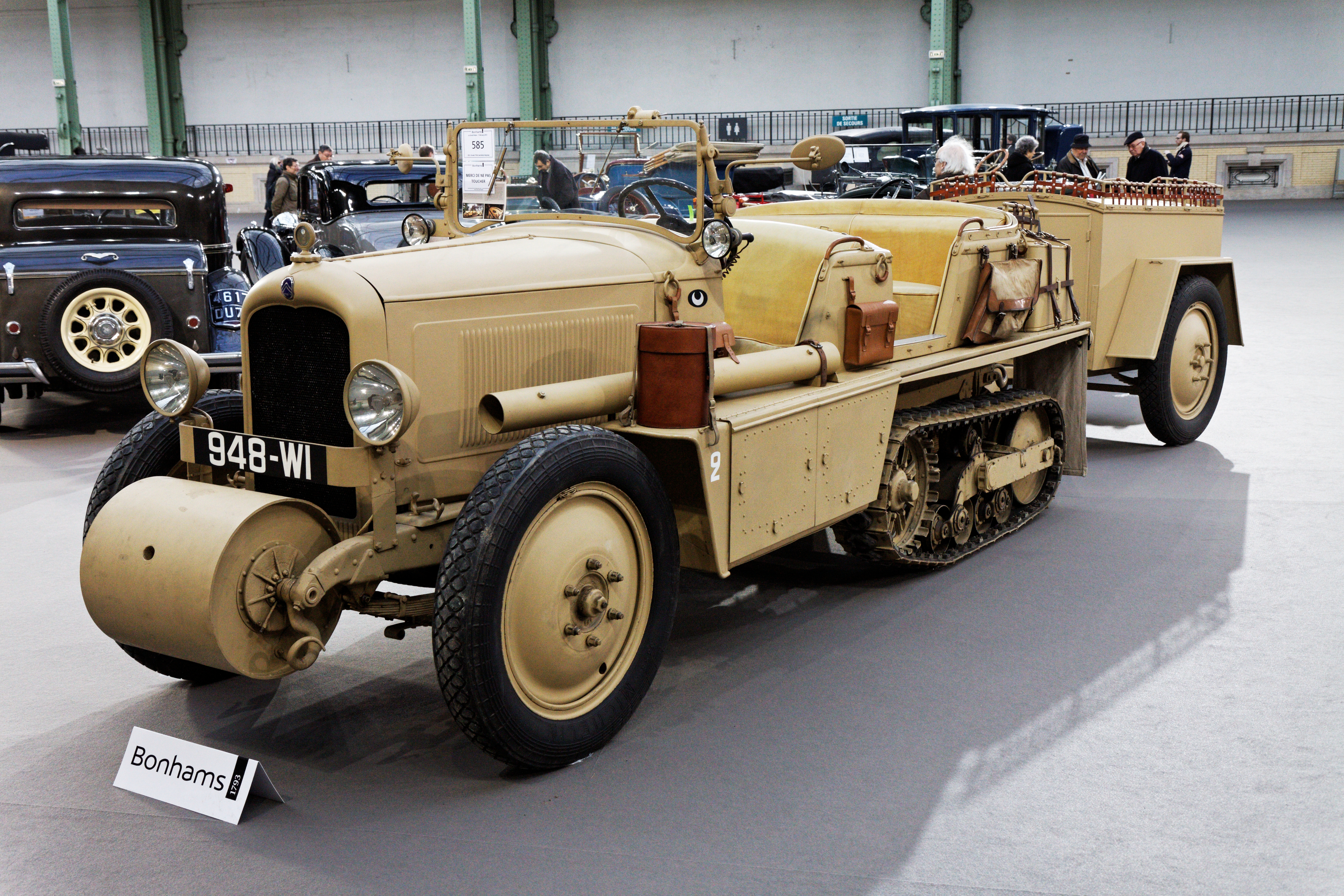
1931 C4 based Citroën P17C Kégresse

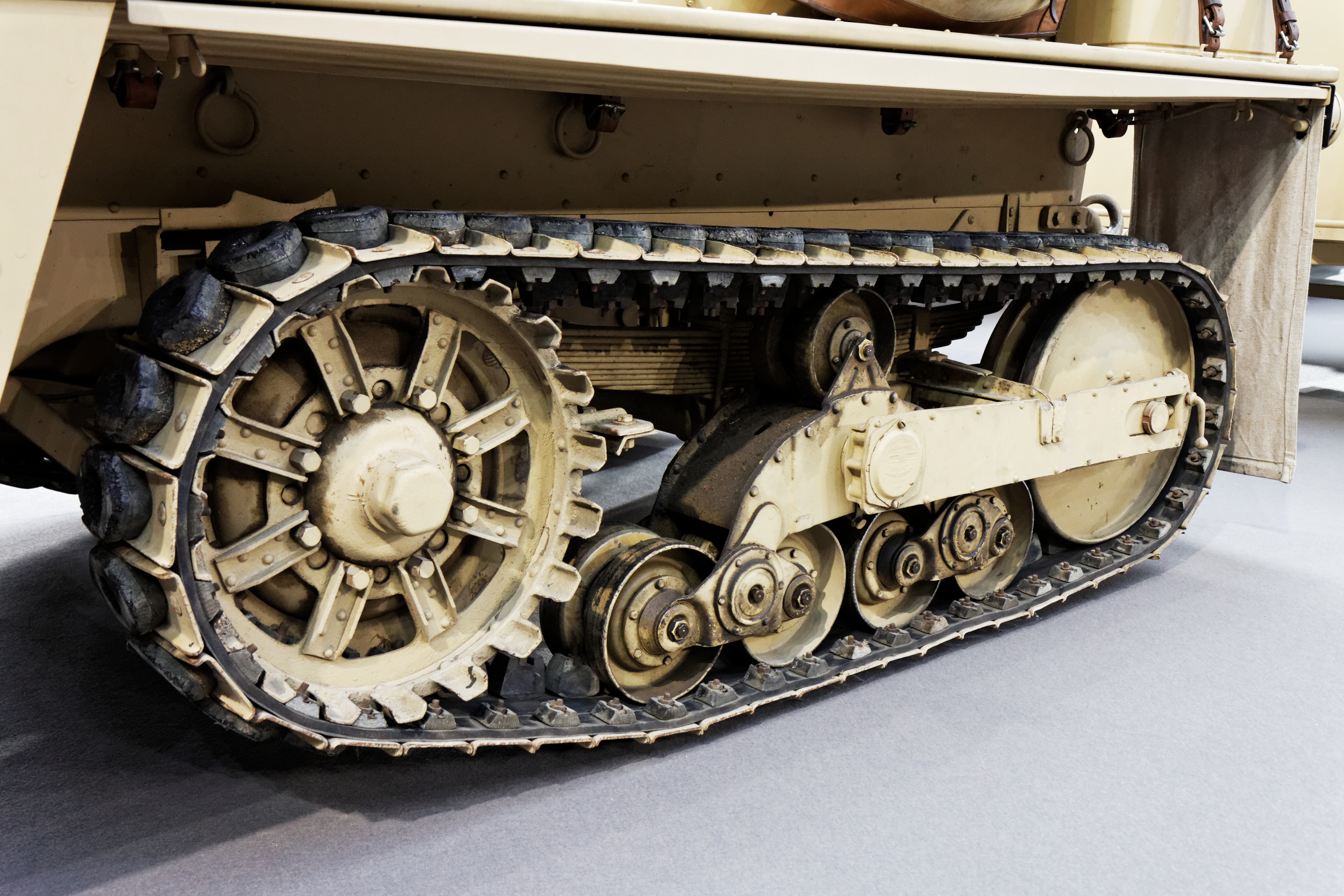
Track System of a 1931 C4 based Citroën P19B Kégresse

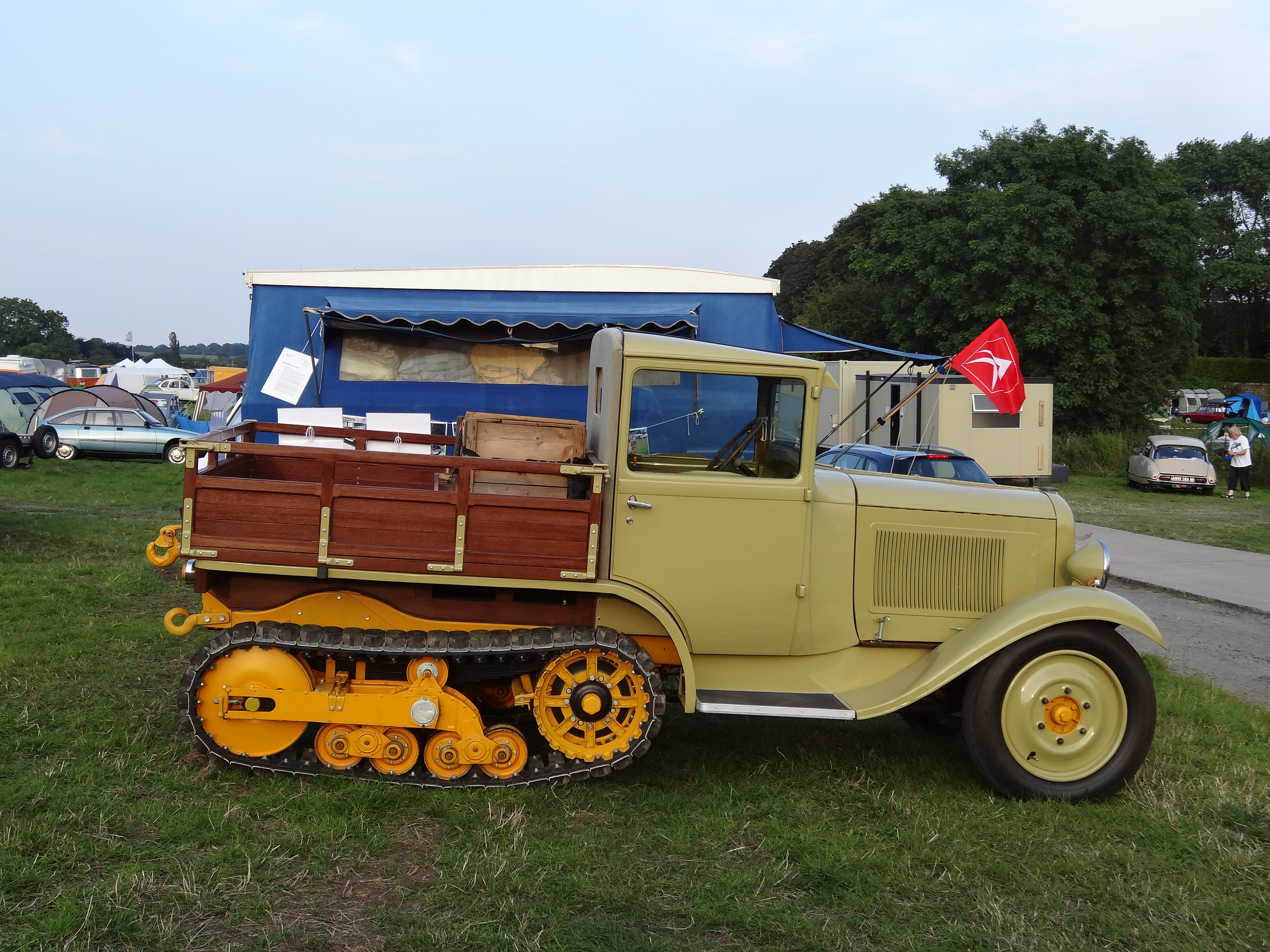
1933 C4 based Citroën P17C Kégresse

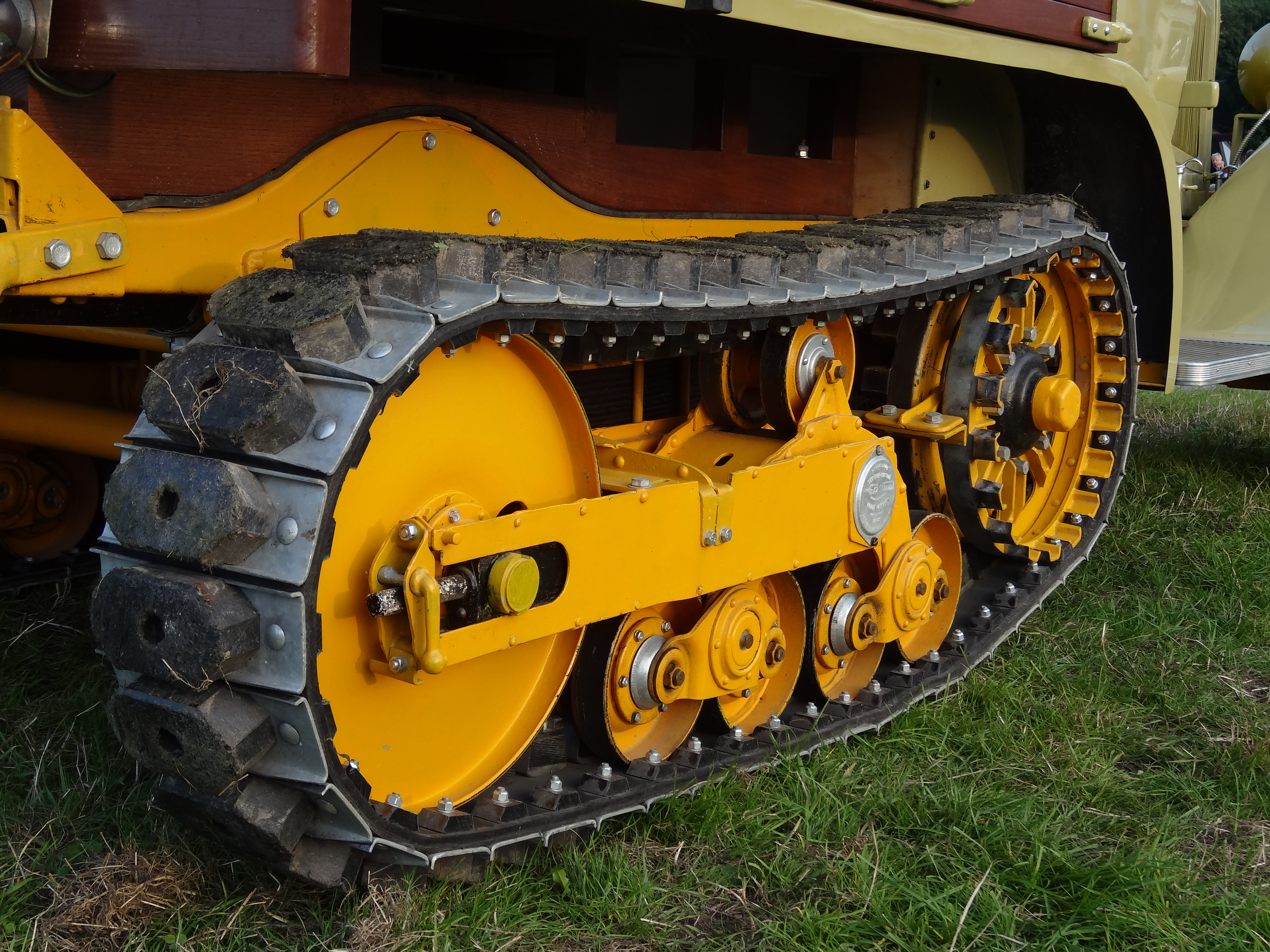
Track System of a 1933 C4 based Citroën P17C Kégresse

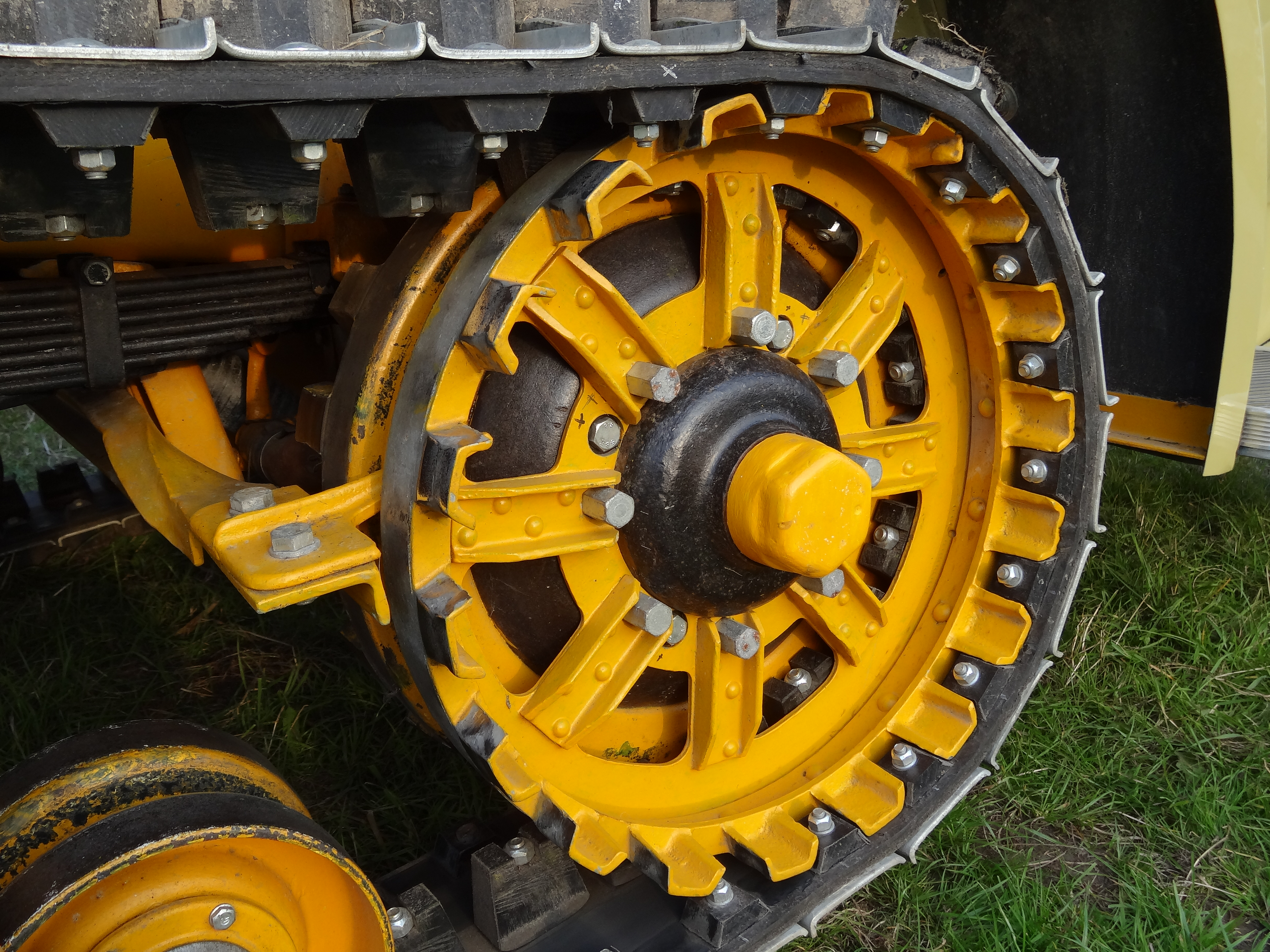
Detail of 1933 C4 based Citroën P17C Kégresse track

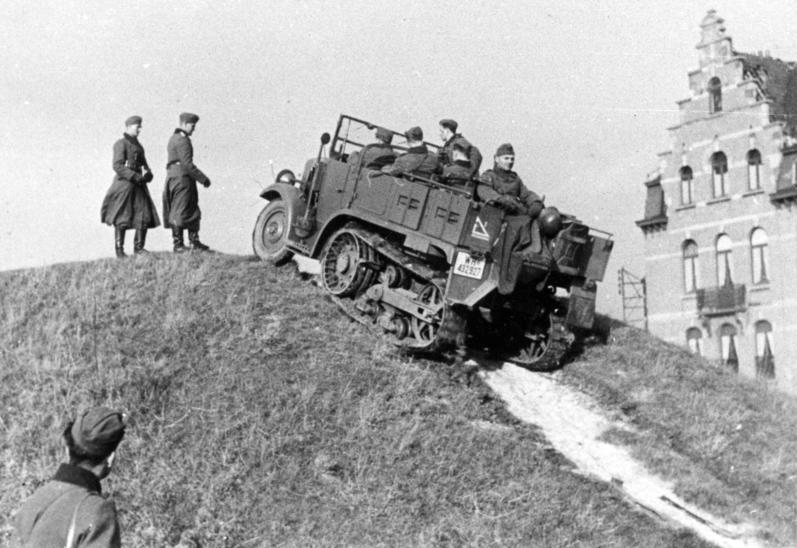
Captured Unic-Kégresse P107 in use by the Wehrmacht in Belgium, November 1940

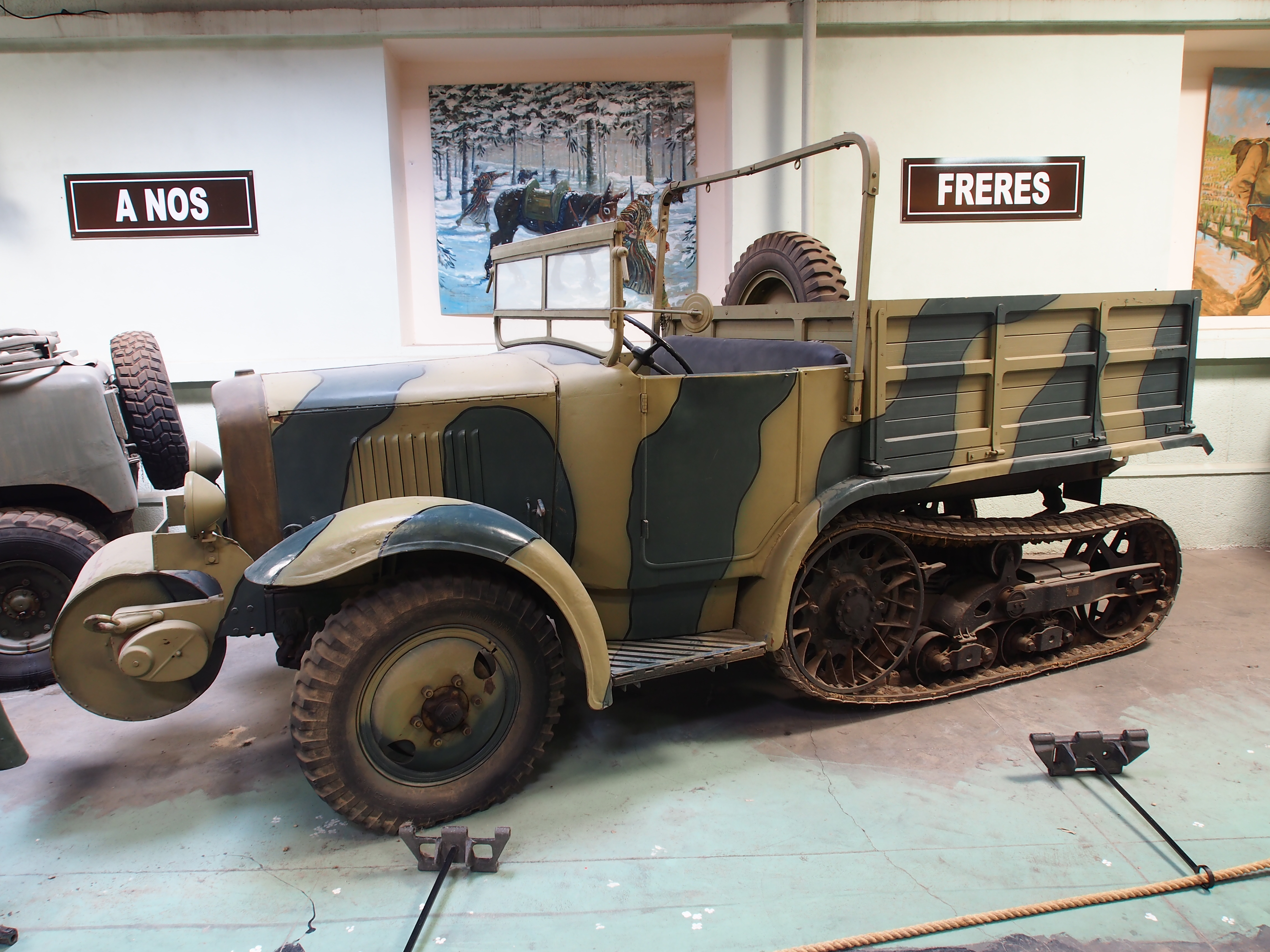
Unic-Kégresse P107 at the Musée des Blindés, France

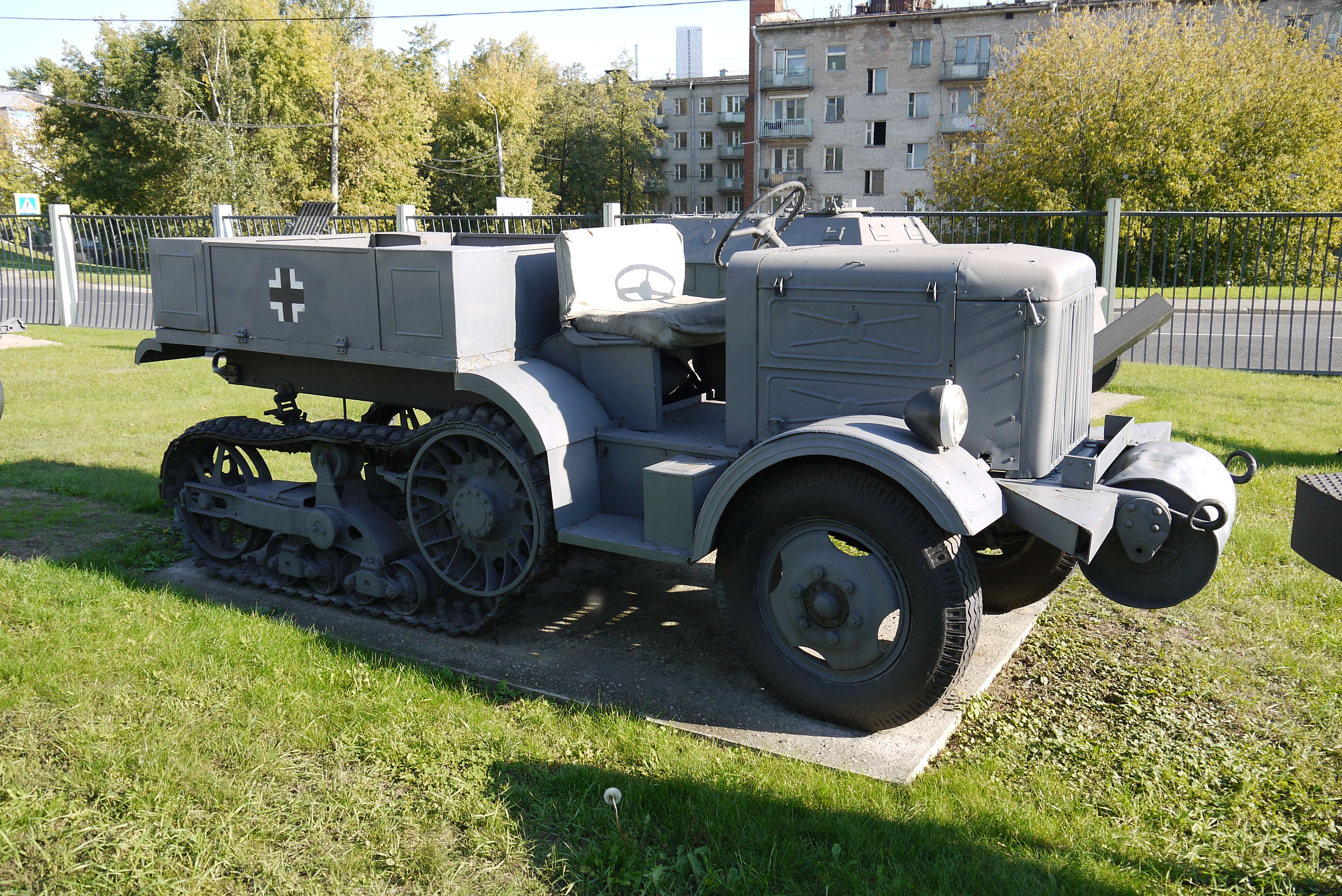
Unic-Kégresse P107 used by the Wehrmacht, in the Museum of the Great Patriotic War, Moscow

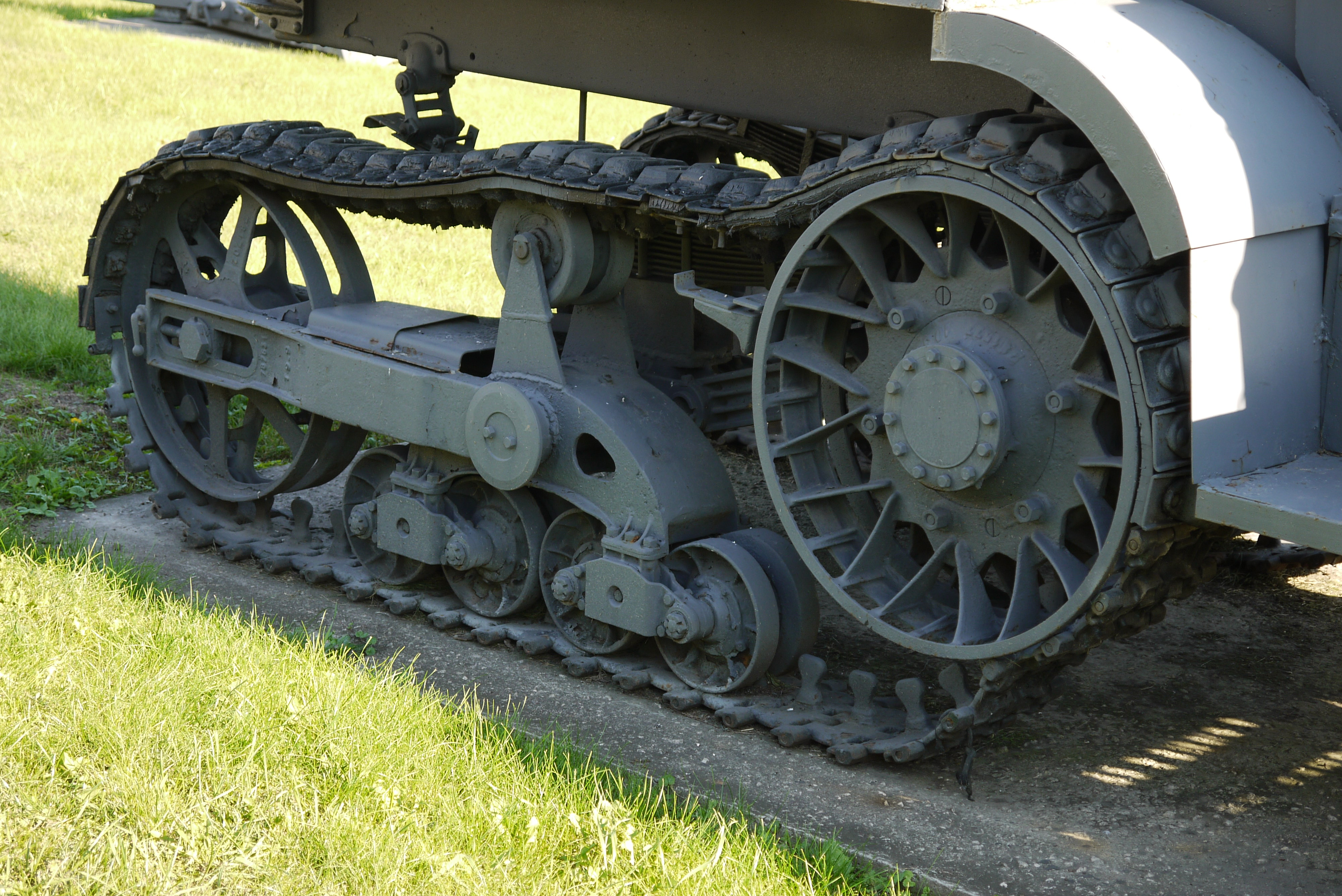
Tracks of a Unic-Kégresse P107, in the Museum of the Great Patriotic War, Moscow

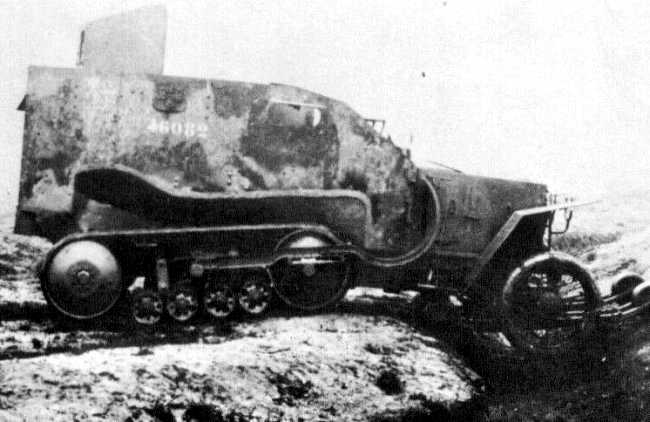
French experimental half-track armoured car Peugeot-Kégresse during testing in 1923

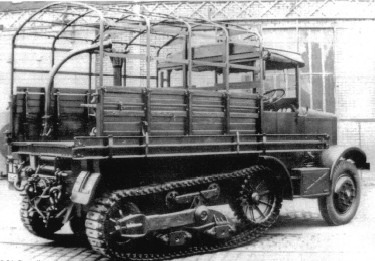
SOMUA MCL-5 in 1939

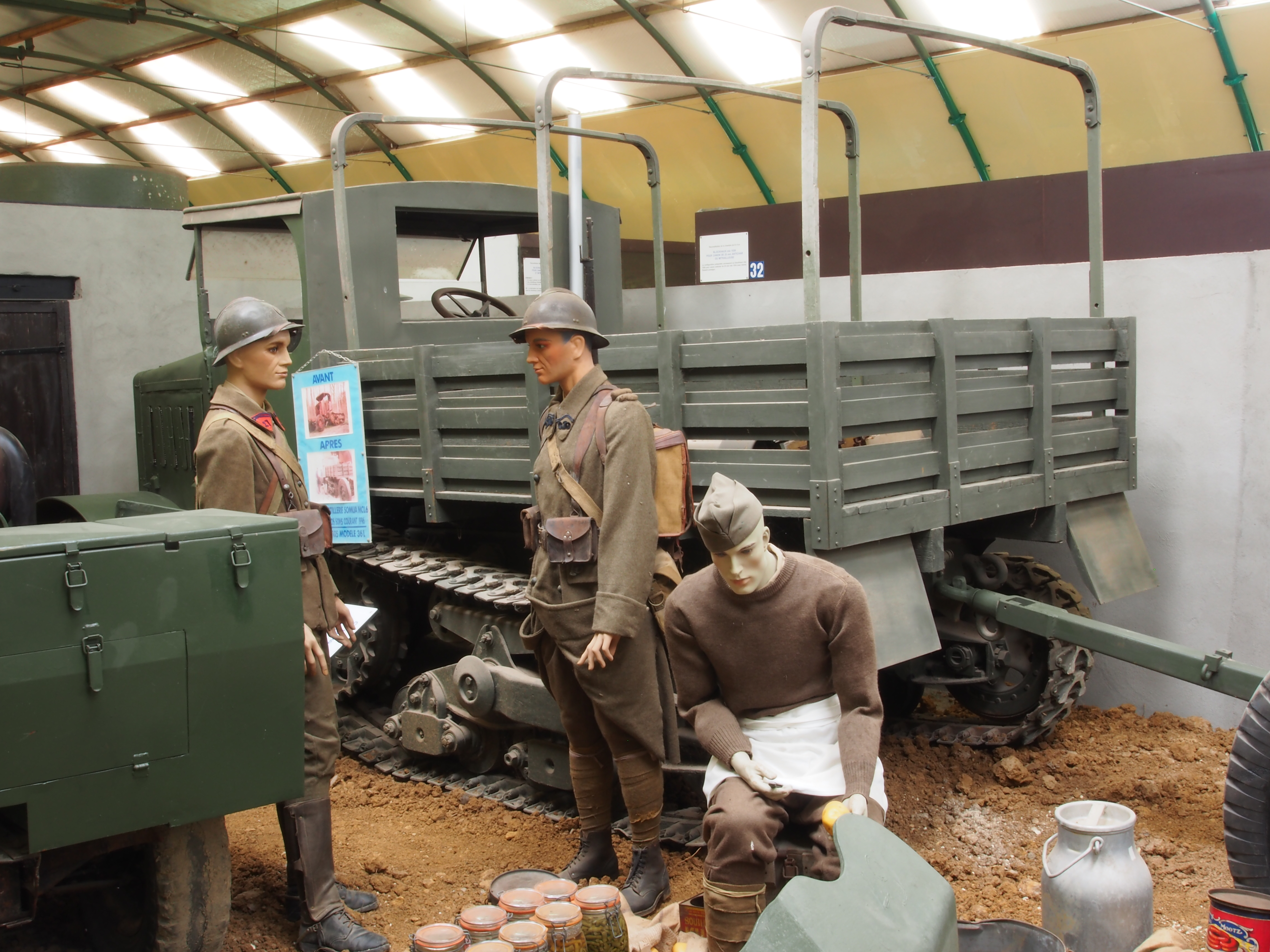
SOMUA MCL6 heavy artillery tractor at Fort de Fermont museum

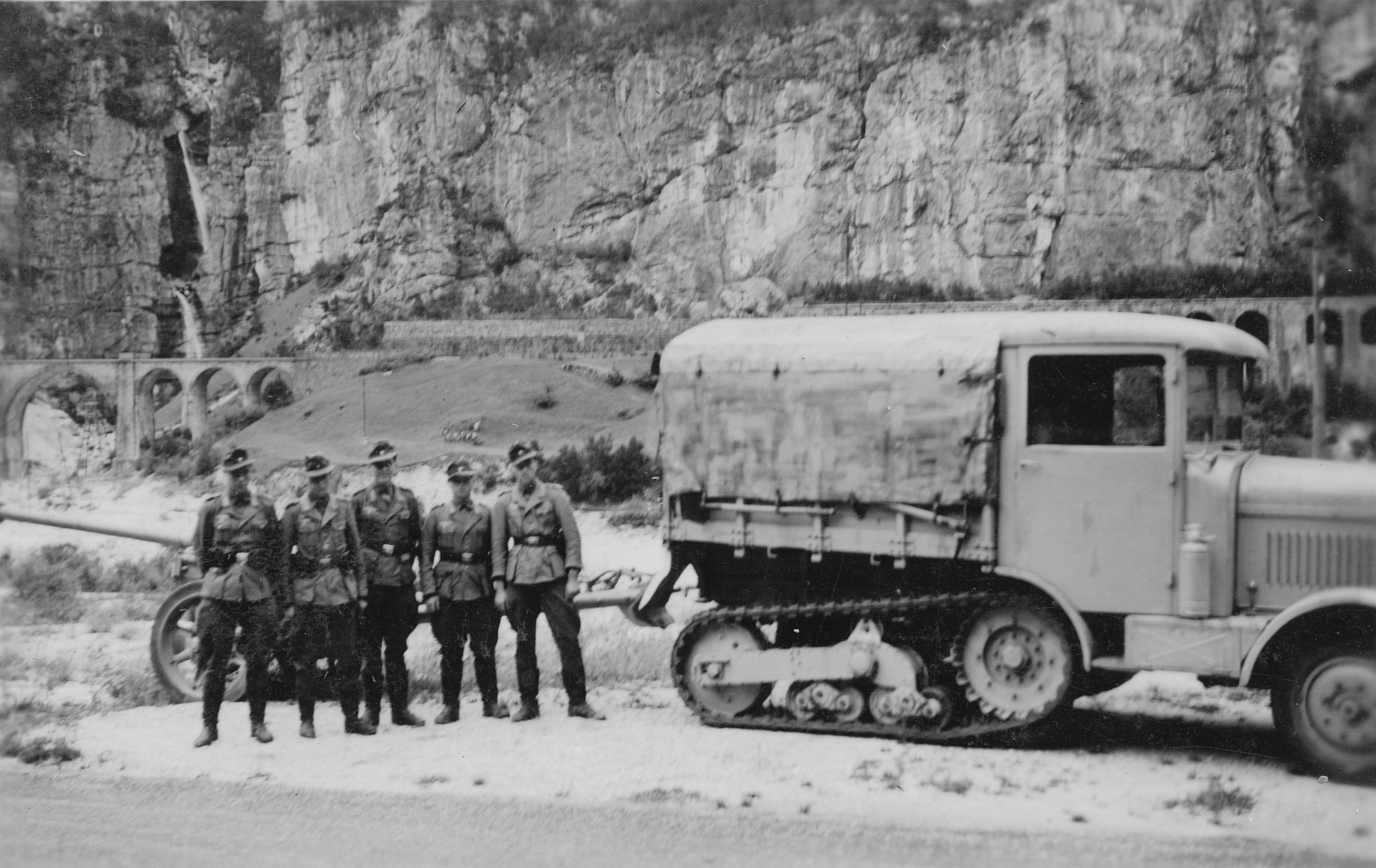
SOMUA MCG with PaK 40 in Italy

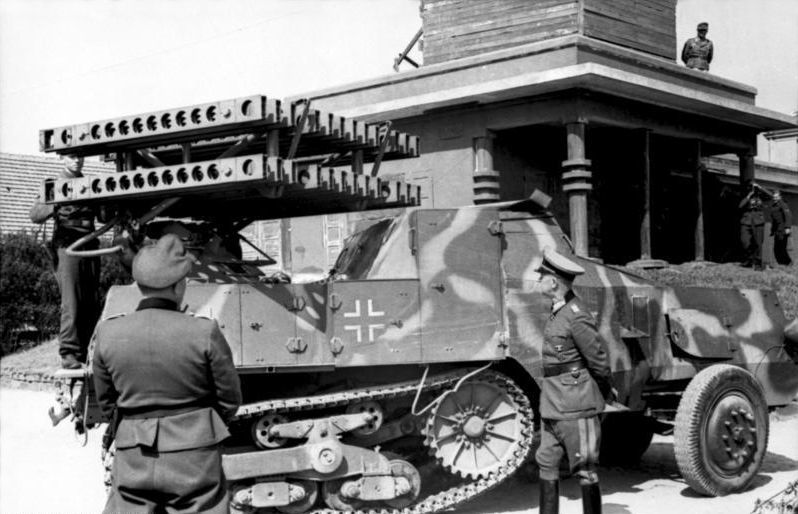
Armoured SOMUA MCG modified by Alfred Becker for use by the Wehrmacht

=== Great Britain ===
British firm Burford developed the Burford-Kégress, an armoured personnel carrier conversion of their 30 cwt trucks. The rear-axle powered Kégresse tracks were produced under license from Citroën. A 1921 prototype passed trials and the British Army placed an order, but in continuous operation the tracks wore and broke. By 1929, the vehicles were taken out of service and later scrapped.

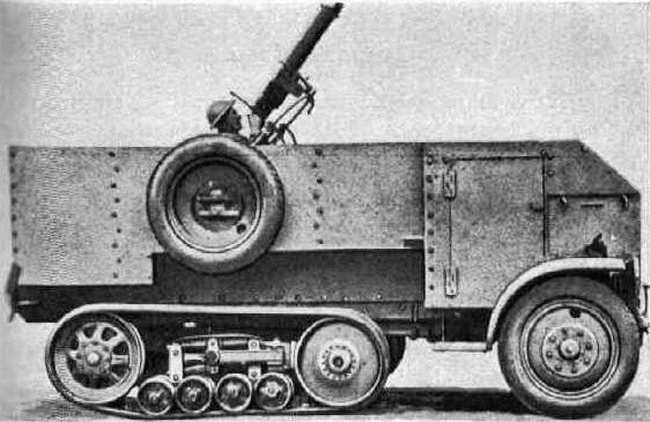
Burford-Kégresse

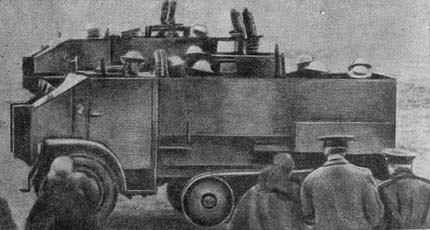
Burford-Kégresse

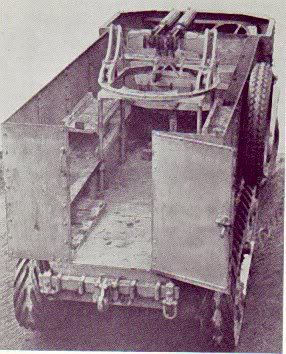
Burford-Kégresse

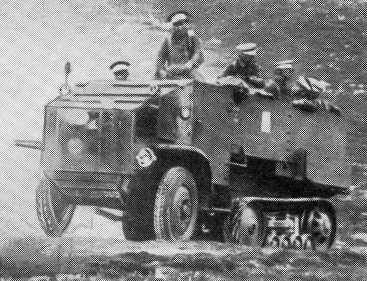
Burford-Kégresse

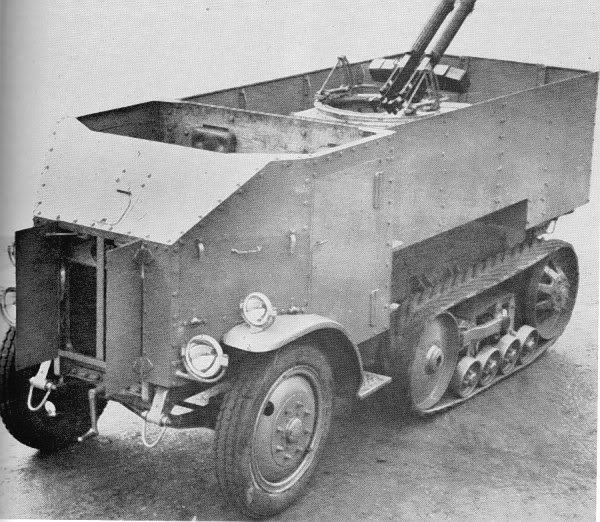
Burford-Kégresse

=== Poland ===
Citroën-Kégresse vehicles served in the Polish motorized artillery during the 1930s.

Domestically produced Kégresse half-track trucks included the 1934 Półgąsienicowy - "Half-track car" - or better known C4P derived from the 4.5-ton Polski Fiat 621 truck.

The C4P was designed by the BiRZ Badań Technicznych Broni Pancernych - Warsaw Armored Weapons and Technical Research Bureau in 1934. The engine and cab received some modifications and the front axle reinforced to integrate the 4x4 transmission. Production began in 1936 at Państwowe Zakłady Inżynierii's Warsaw plant. By 1939, more than 400 were produced including at least 80 artillery tractors.

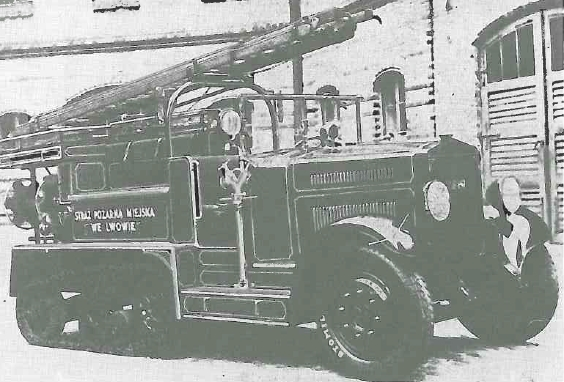
C4P fire engine 1939

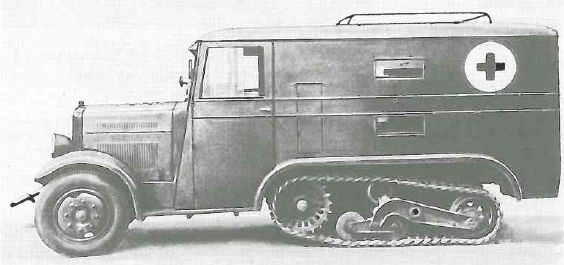
Military ambulance 1939

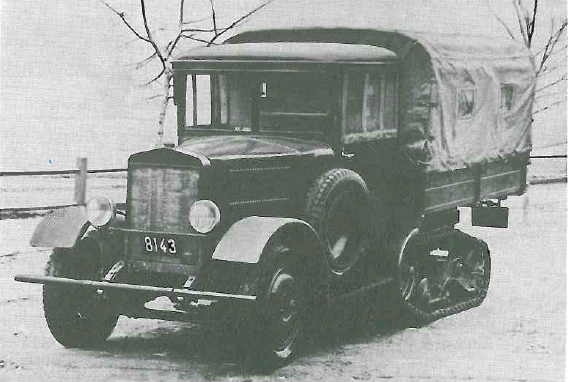
Military truck 1939

=== Belgium ===
The FN-Kégresse 3T was a half-track vehicle used by Belgian armed forces as an artillery tractor between 1934 and 1940. 130 were built, with some 100 in service before the German invasion.

=== United States ===
In the late 1920s, the US Army purchased Citroën-Kégresse vehicles for evaluation, followed by a licence to produce the tracks. A 1939 prototype went into production with M2 and M3 half-track versions. More than 41,000 vehicles in over 70 versions were produced between 1940 and 1944.

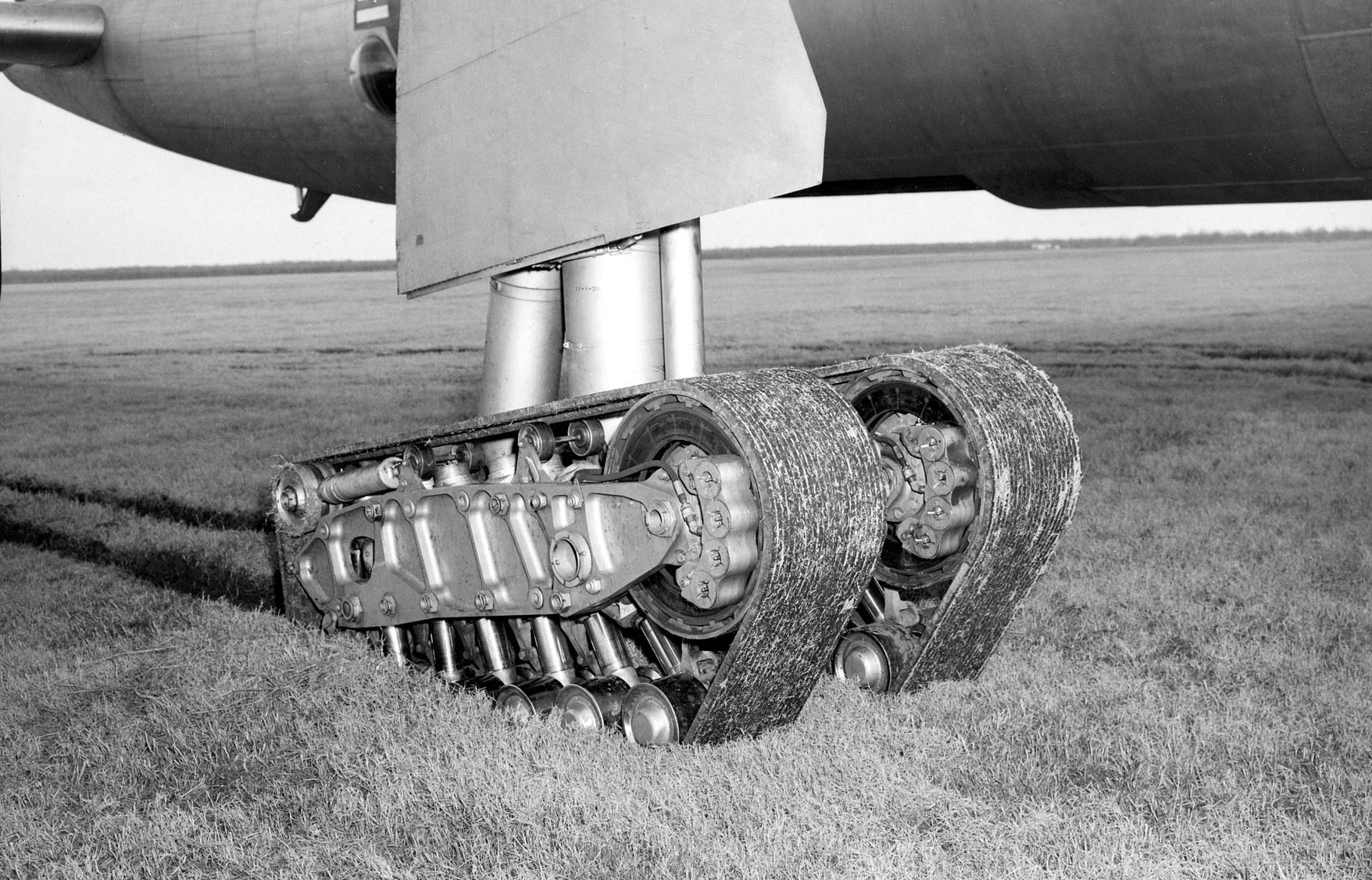
Experimental Kégresse track on Convair XB-36 Peacemaker
