= CWS =

CWS may refer to:

== Environment ==
- Canadian Wildlife Service, part of Environment and Climate Change Canada
- Currumbin Wildlife Sanctuary, Queensland, Australia
- County Wildlife Site, local reserve status

== Baseball ==
- Chicago White Sox, a Major League Baseball team
- College World Series, the eight-team final phase of the annual NCAA Division I baseball tournament
- Caribbean World Series, a yearly tournament

== Cooperatives ==
- Church World Service, a cooperative humanitarian ministry
- The Co-operative Group, formerly Co-operative Wholesale Society, a consumer co-operative in the United Kingdom
- Co-operative wholesale society, a form of co-operative federation

== Technology ==
- Centralne Warsztaty Samochodowe, a Polish pre-war automobile manufacturer
  - CWS T-1, the first serially built car manufactured in Poland
- Control Wheel Steering, an autopilot mode where the pilot controls the autopilot through the yoke
- CoolWebSearch, spyware

== Military ==
- Chemical Warfare Service, a U.S. Army service branch, later known as Chemical Corps
- Commander's Weapon Station, the aiming and firing system for the Commander's machine gun on the M1 Abrams tank

== Other ==
- Calfrac Well Services, an oilfield servicing company
- Celebrity worship syndrome, an obsessive-addictive disorder in which a person becomes overly involved with the details of a celebrity's personal life
- Christian Worship: Supplement, a hymnal used by the WELS
- Chronic wasting disease, a transmissible disease affecting deer and other cervid animals
- Compressed work schedule, a term for the four-day workweek

== See also ==
- CWSDPMI, a DOS extender by Charles W. Sandmann
