= Automotive industry in Poland =

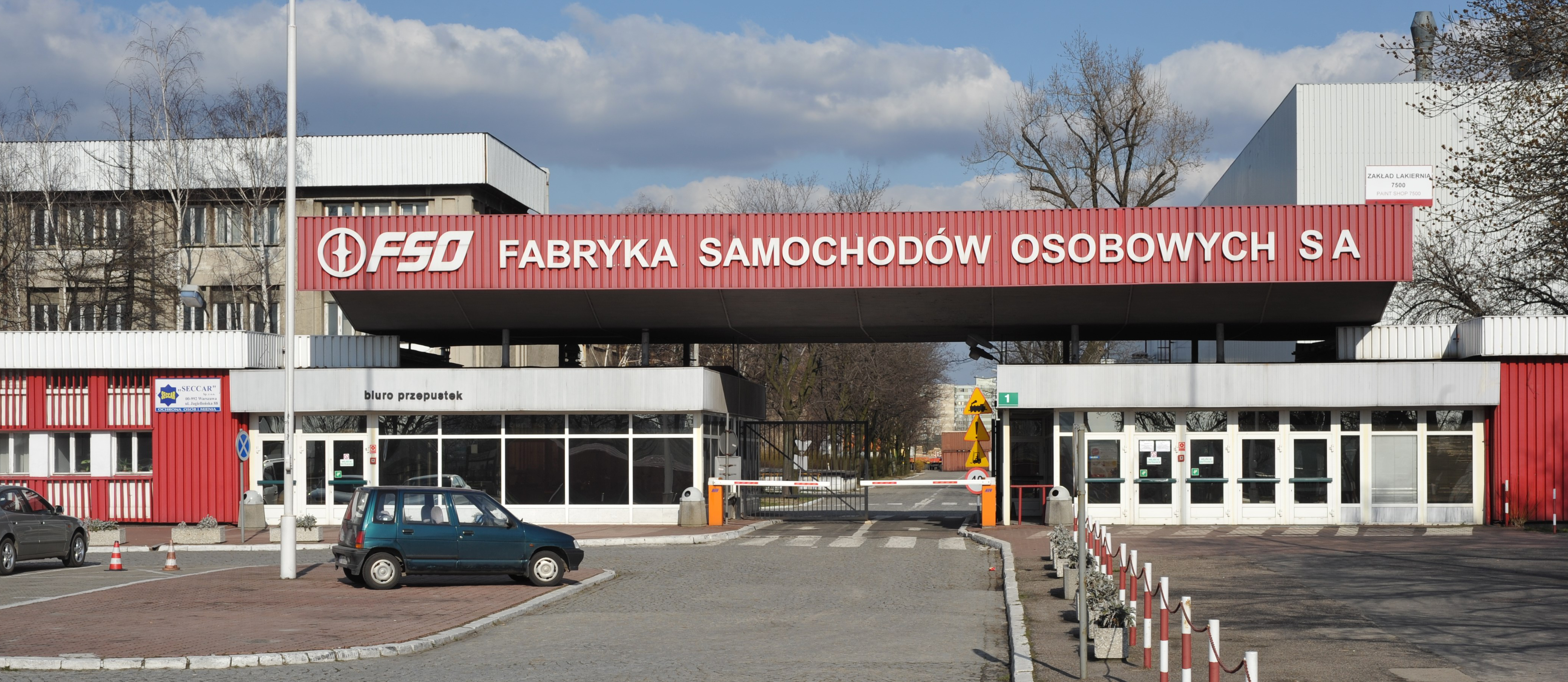
- FSO is formerly one of the largest Polish car factories and the most recognizable car brand from Poland.

The automobile industry in Poland makes up a sizeable part of the Polish economy, accounting for about 11% of Poland's industrial production. Poland is one of the largest producer of light vehicles (passenger cars) in Central and Eastern Europe. As of 2024 Poland was the 25th largest automaker in the world.

== History ==
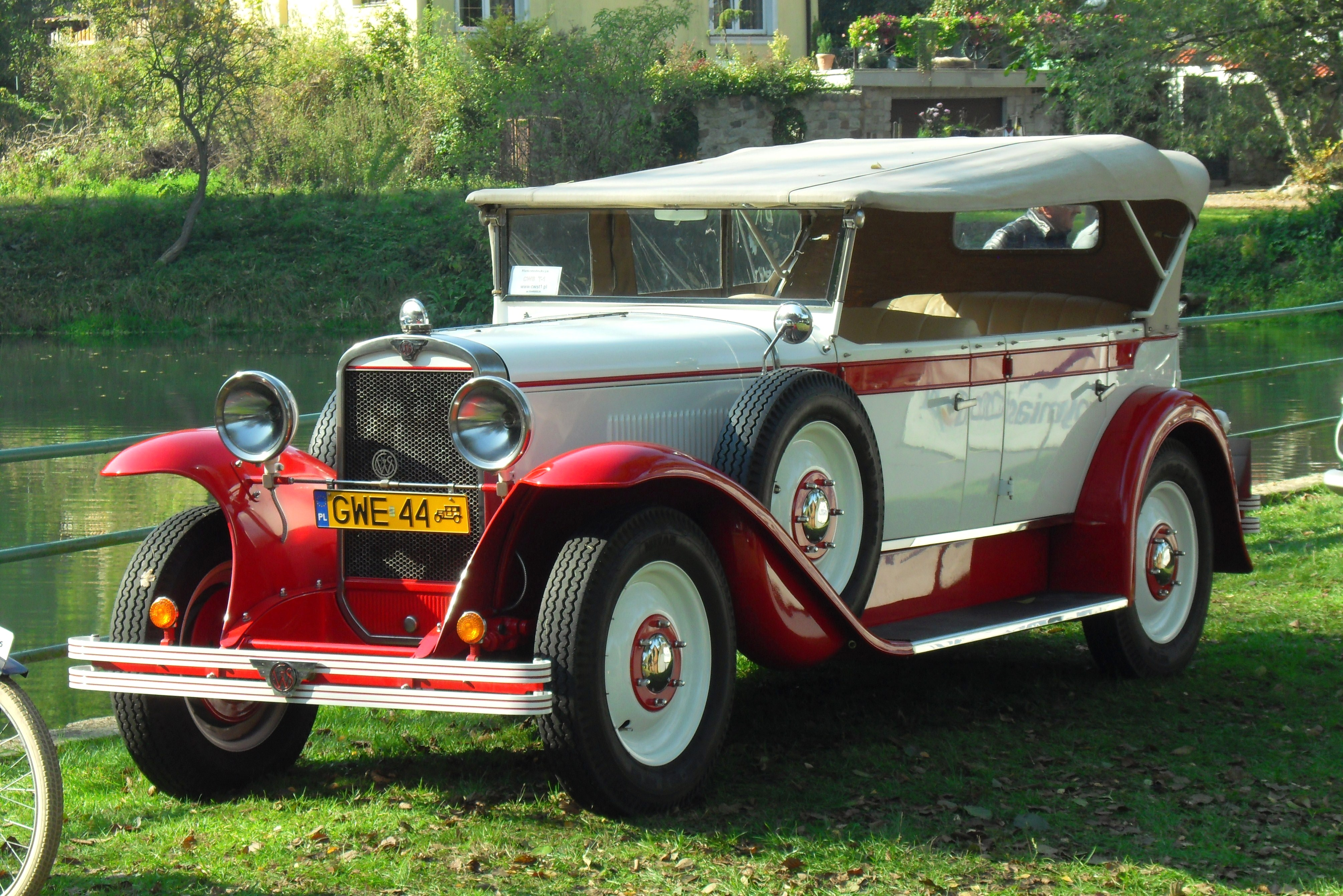
A replica of CWS T-1, the first car manufactured in Poland

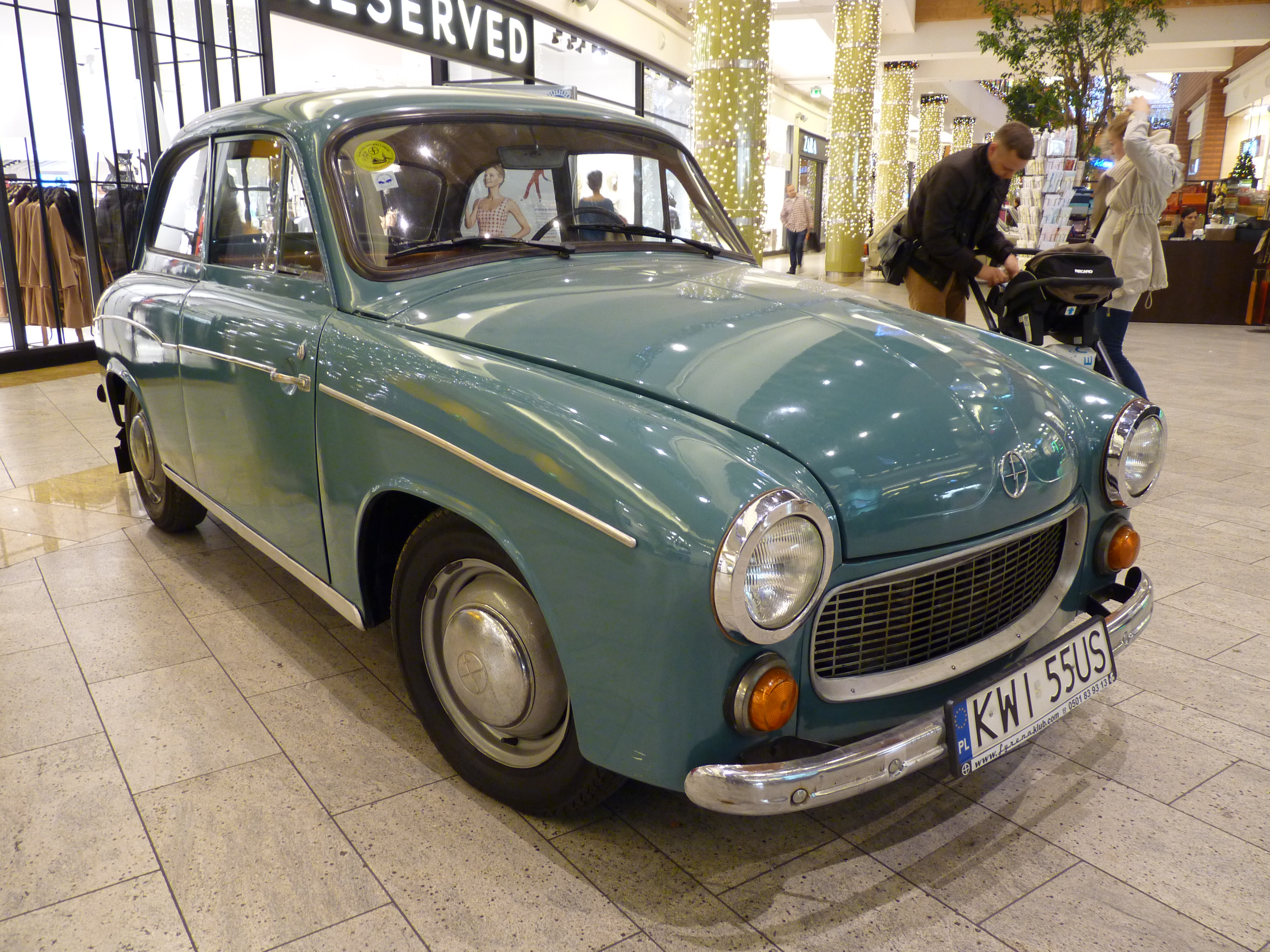
FSO Syrena 104

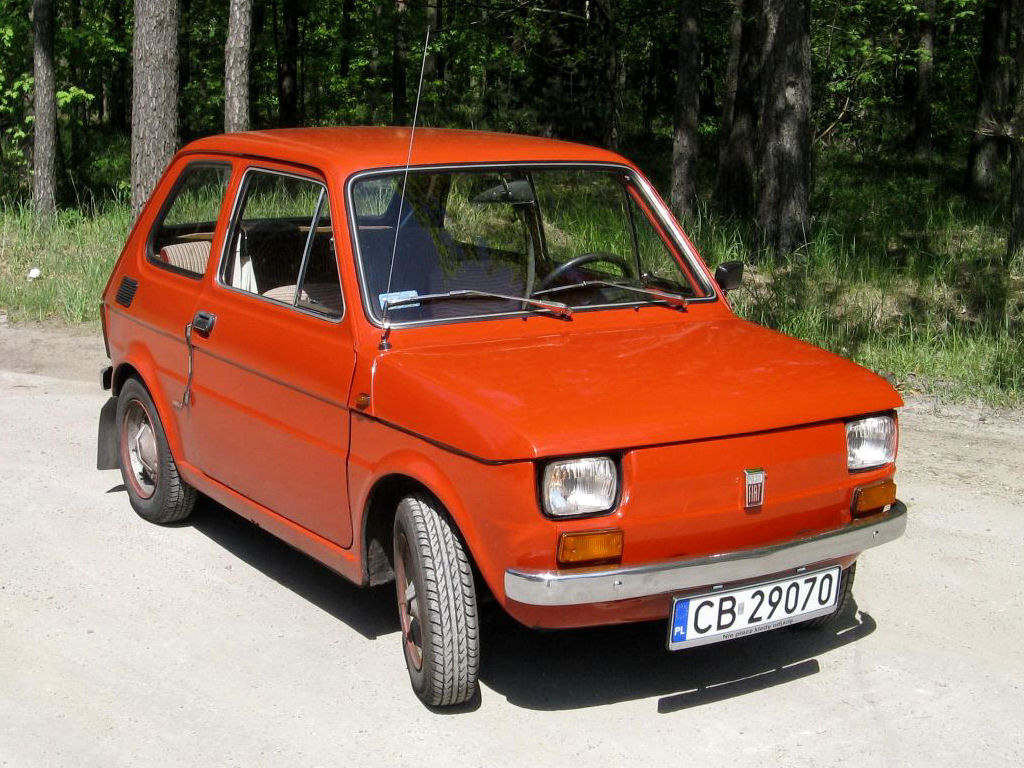
Polski Fiat 126p, 1973, likely the most iconic car of Polish manufacture in the world

The first Polish company that produced automobile vehicles, Ursus, was established in 1893, and became known for a line of tractors produced since 1922. After Poland regained independence in the aftermath of World War I, Polish automotive industry produced a number of light military vehicles, such as armored cars tankettes and light tanks (7TP being the most advanced model). Civilian automotive production also existed, with the Centralne Warsztaty Samochodowe (later, Państwowe Zakłady Inżynieryjne) being the most notable company. Nonetheless, compared to more industrialized countries in the Western Europe, interwar Poland is seen as having rather limited auto producing capacities before World War II.

Interrupted by World War II (German invasion of Poland), then destruction and plunder of the industry (including the automotive industry) by Germans, automobile production in Poland resumed afterward, and the socialist People's Republic of Poland produced 417 834 vehicles in 1980 which gave Poland the 13th place in the world, 8th in Europe and 2nd after the USSR in the Eastern Bloc. Of models of that era, the best known were those from FSO: FSO Warszawa, FSO Syrena, Polski Fiat / FSO 125p, FSO Polonez and the Polski Fiat 126p from FSM. The Polski Fiat 126p or "maluch" was a particularly iconic car of that period.

Production increased following the fall of communism, and peaked at 650,000 vehicles around 1999, declining for the next few years. In the early 2000, around the years 2002–2003, Poland produced about 300,000 light vehicles a year, a number that increased once again after the accession of Poland to the European Union in 2004, having doubled by the mid-2000s and then almost tripled by the end of the decade around 2009 and then began to fall.

== Current situation ==
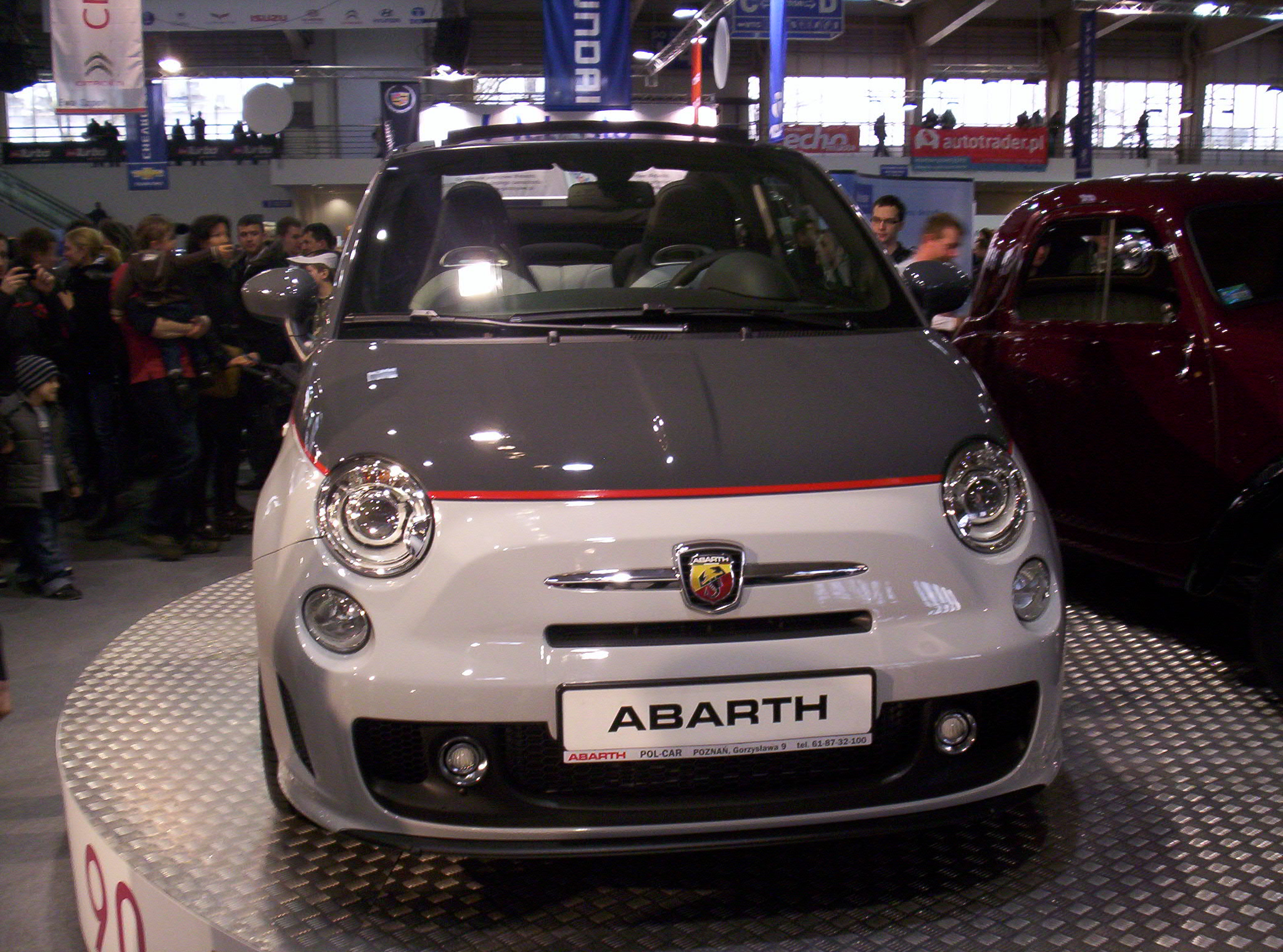
2011 Fiat Abarth 500C, a recent model of Fiat produced in Poland

During 2007-2009, Poland was the second largest producer of light vehicles (passenger cars) in Central and Eastern Europe, after the Czech Republic (and not counting Russia). As of the late 2000s and early 2010s, Polish automotive sector represents around 11% of total industrial production, accounting for about 4% of GDP. The sector employs about 130,000 people, and produces about 800,000–900,000 light vehicles a year. Production of larger commercial vehicles was at about 70,000–90,000 in that period. Most of the sector's output is geared for exports, primarily to the European Union. In 2009 the value of exports from this sector was €15.7 billion, i.e. 16% of all Polish exports. Since 2010, the number of cars made in Poland has been decreasing from 869,376 to 583,258 in 2013. As of that year Poland was the 23rd largest automaker in the world.

Major western companies with significant presence in the Polish automotive sector include Fiat, Opel, Toyota, Volkswagen, MAN Nutzfahrzeuge, Volvo and Scania AB. Out of those, historically Fiat had a very strong presence in Poland for almost a century: the Polski Fiat assembly plan was established in the 1920s, and while interrupted by World War II, production of Fiat-licensed vehicles resumed in socialist Poland in 1967.

Majority of major the sector is controlled by western companies and financed by foreign investment; with the Solaris bus and truck producer being the largest company in the market owned by Polish investors.

Some models produced in Poland in the recent years include Opel Astra III and IV, the Fiat Panda and the Fiat 500, the Lancia Ypsilon, the Ford Ka, and the Chevrolet Aveo.

=== Electric vehicles (EV) ===
In 2016, The Law and Justice (Pis) government created Electromobility Poland, by four state-owned power companies. Electromobility Poland wants to launch two Electric models in 2023. In 2020, Poland has also become one of the largest electric bus producing countries in Europe with approximatively a third of the production. Additionally to original Polish manufacturers Solaris and Rafako, MAN Truck & Bus of Volkswagen Group has opened a production line in Starachowice, Volvo in Wroclaw and Scania in Slupsk. In 2022, Cyfrowy Polsat Group announced own hydrogen-powered bus known as a NesoBus.

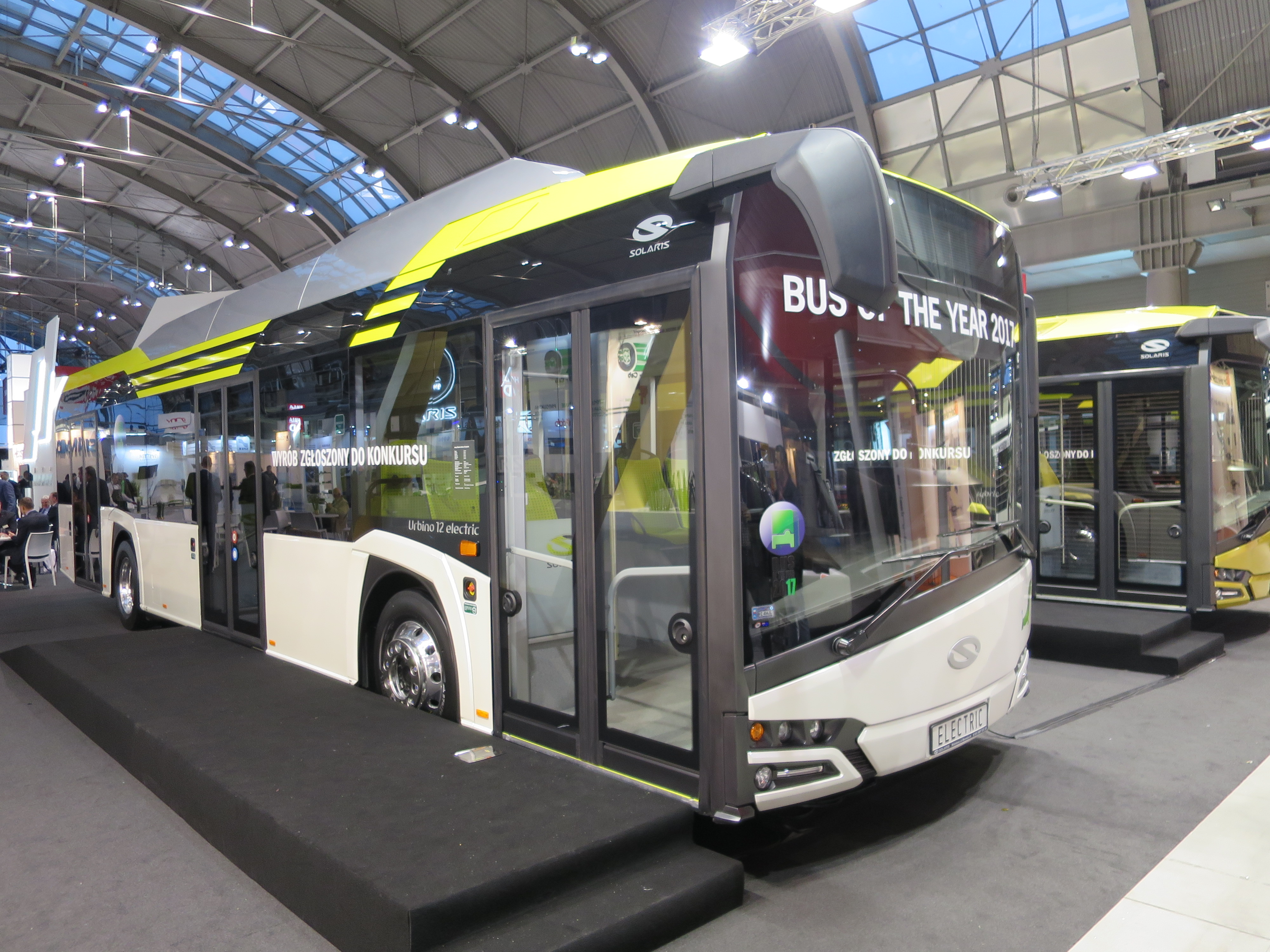
Solaris Urbino 12 Electric

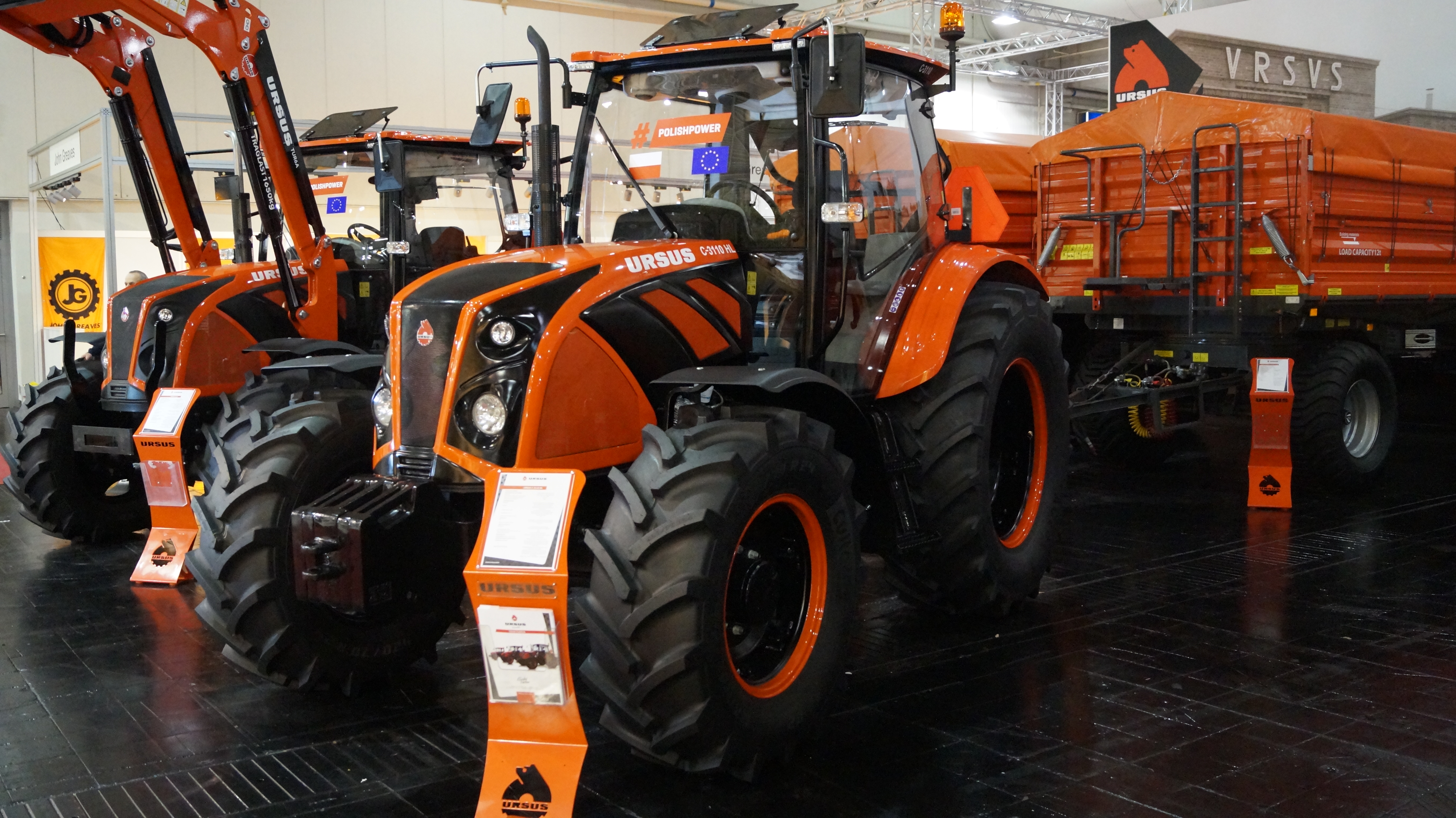
Ursus C-3110HL tractor

- AMZ-Kutno
- Automet
- Autosan
- Stellantis Poland (ex-FSM)
- Jelcz
- Melex
- MAN Bus/MAN Trucks (ex-Star)
- Opel Manufacturing Poland (now Stellantis)
- Scania Production Słupsk
- Solaris
- Solbus
- Toyota
- Ursus
- Volkswagen Poznań (ex-FSR/Tarpan).
- Volvo Buses Polska
- Huta Stalowa Wola

== Defunct manufacturers ==
- AS
- CWS
- Arrinera
- FSC/FS/Daewoo Motor Polska/Andoria-Mot/Intrall Polska/Honker
- FSM
- FSO
- FSO ZSD/FSD Nysa
- FSR
- Kapena (Cacciamali)
- K. Rudzki i S-ka (Ralf-Stetysz)
- Leopard Automobile Mielec Sp. z o.o.
- LRL
- Neoplan Polska
- Polski Fiat
- PZInż
- Star
- WSK Mielec (Mikrus)

== Gallery ==
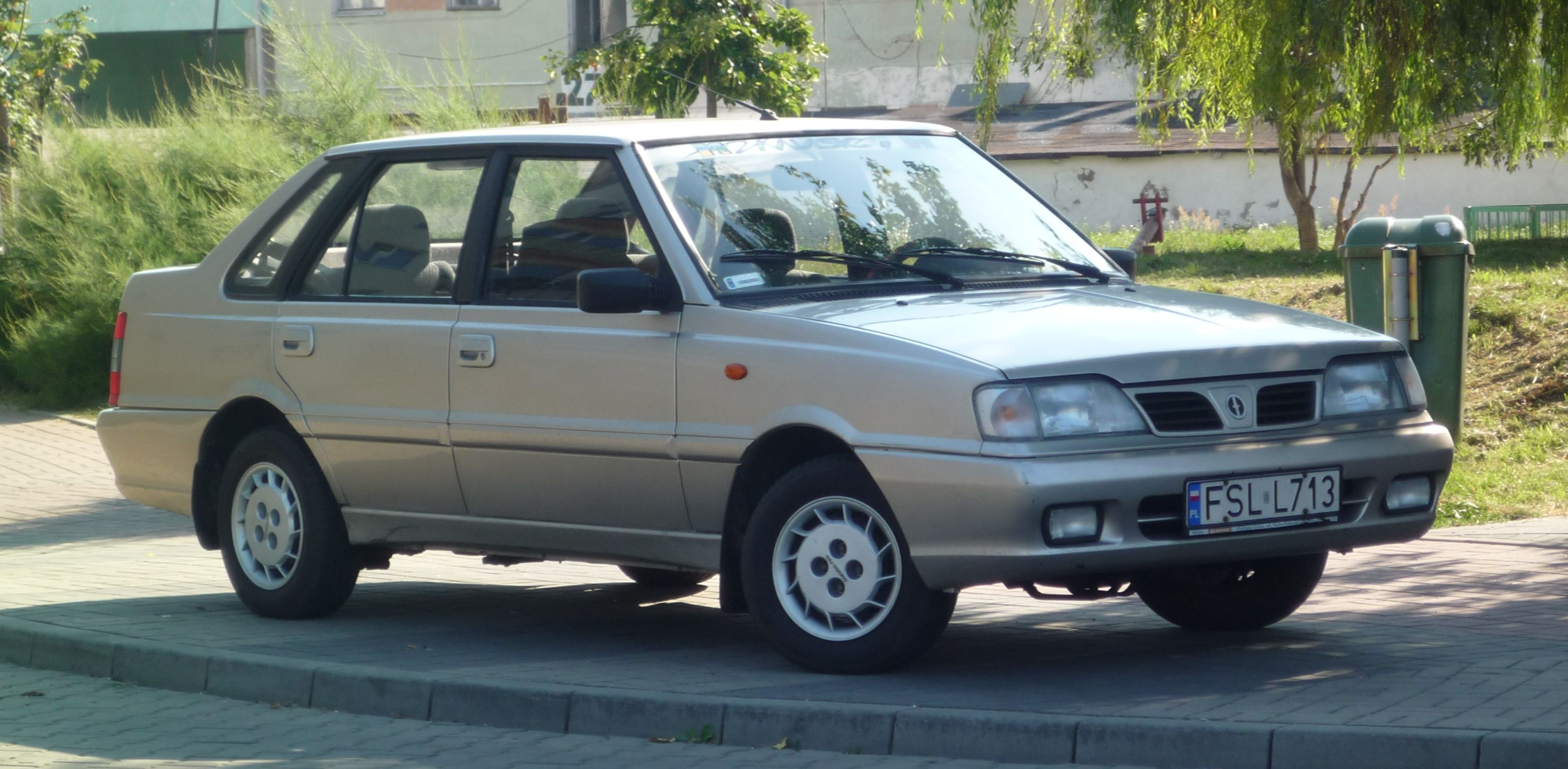
FSO Polonez Atu Plus

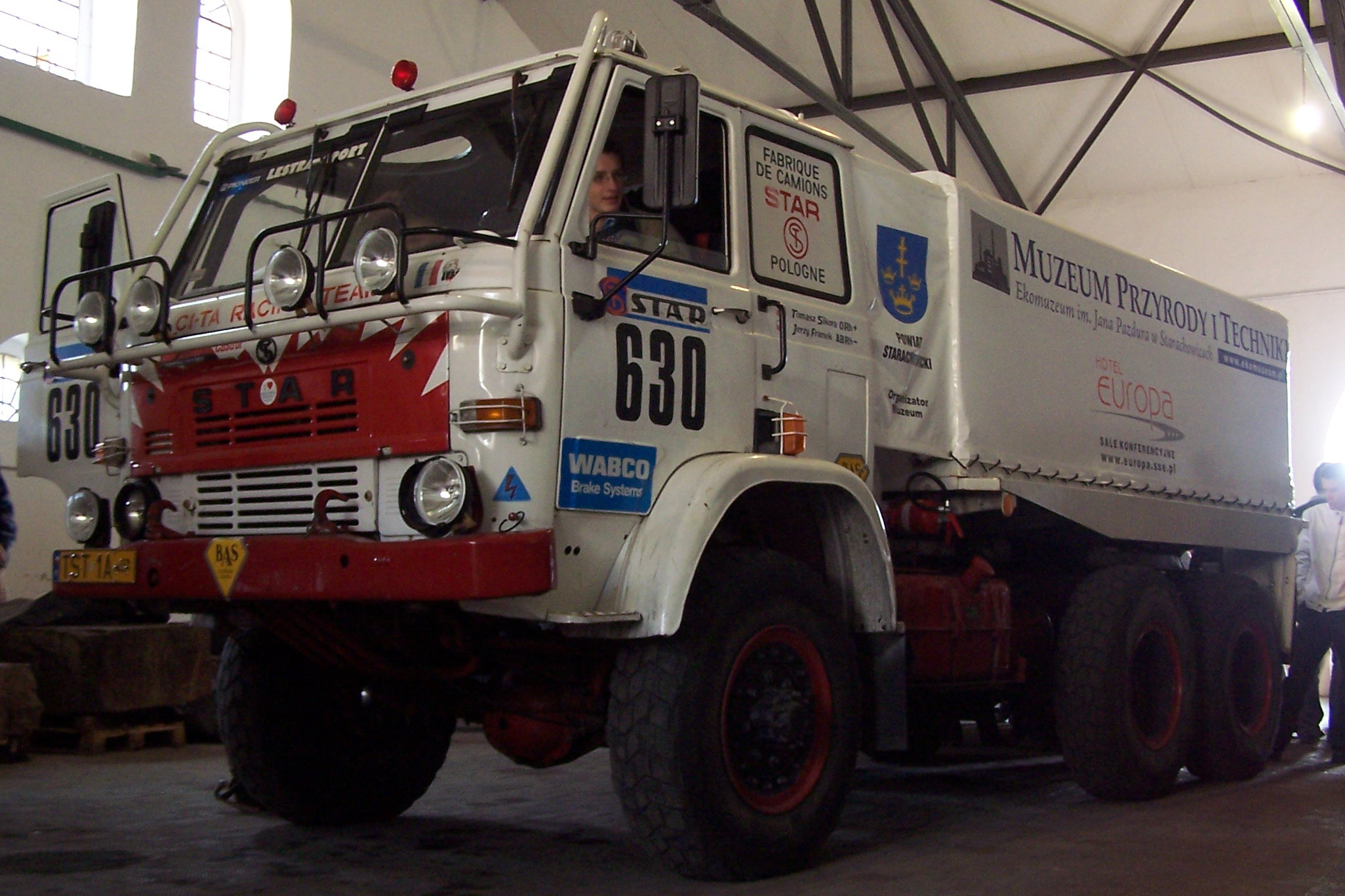
Star 266 truck

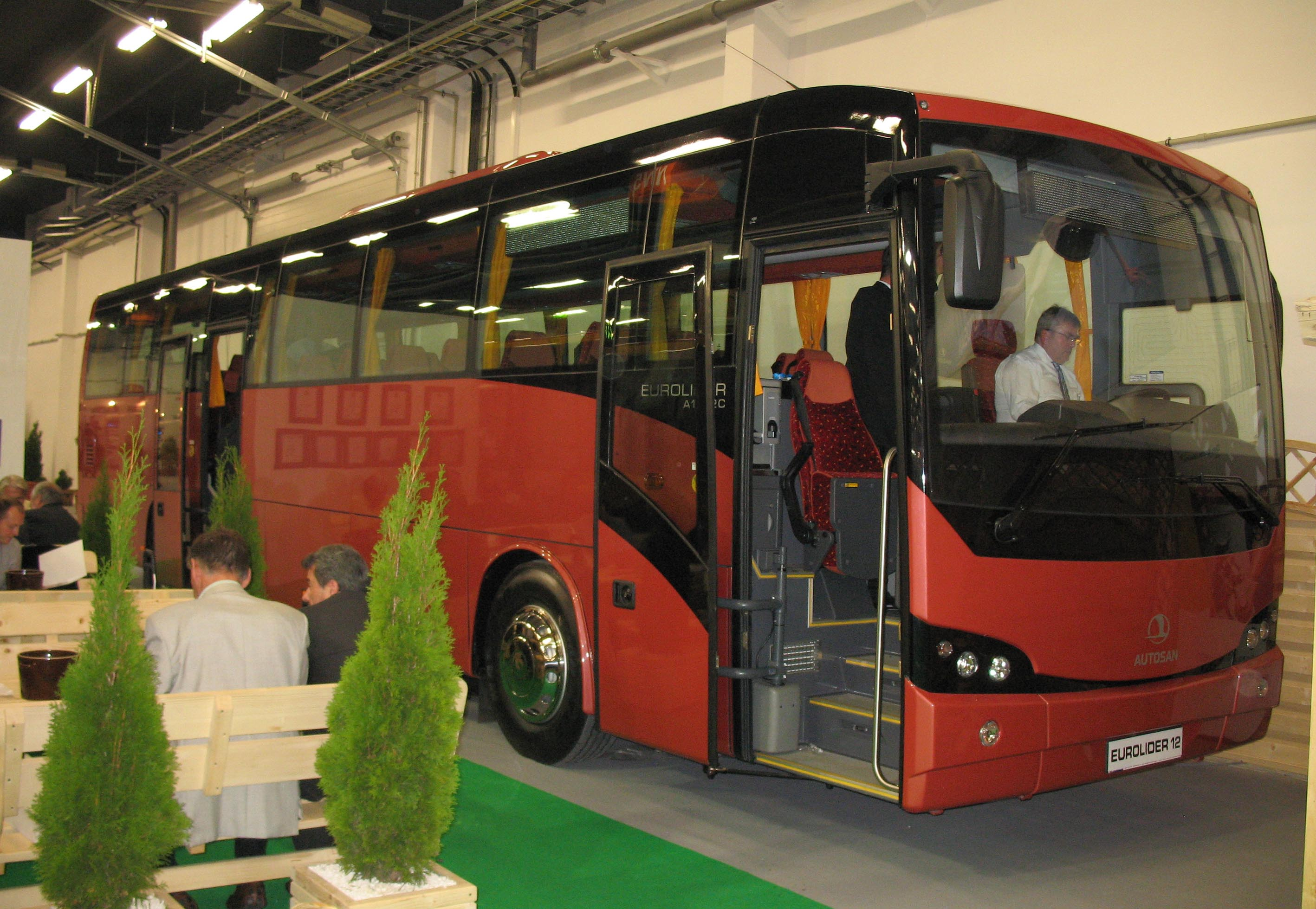
Autosan Eurolider 12

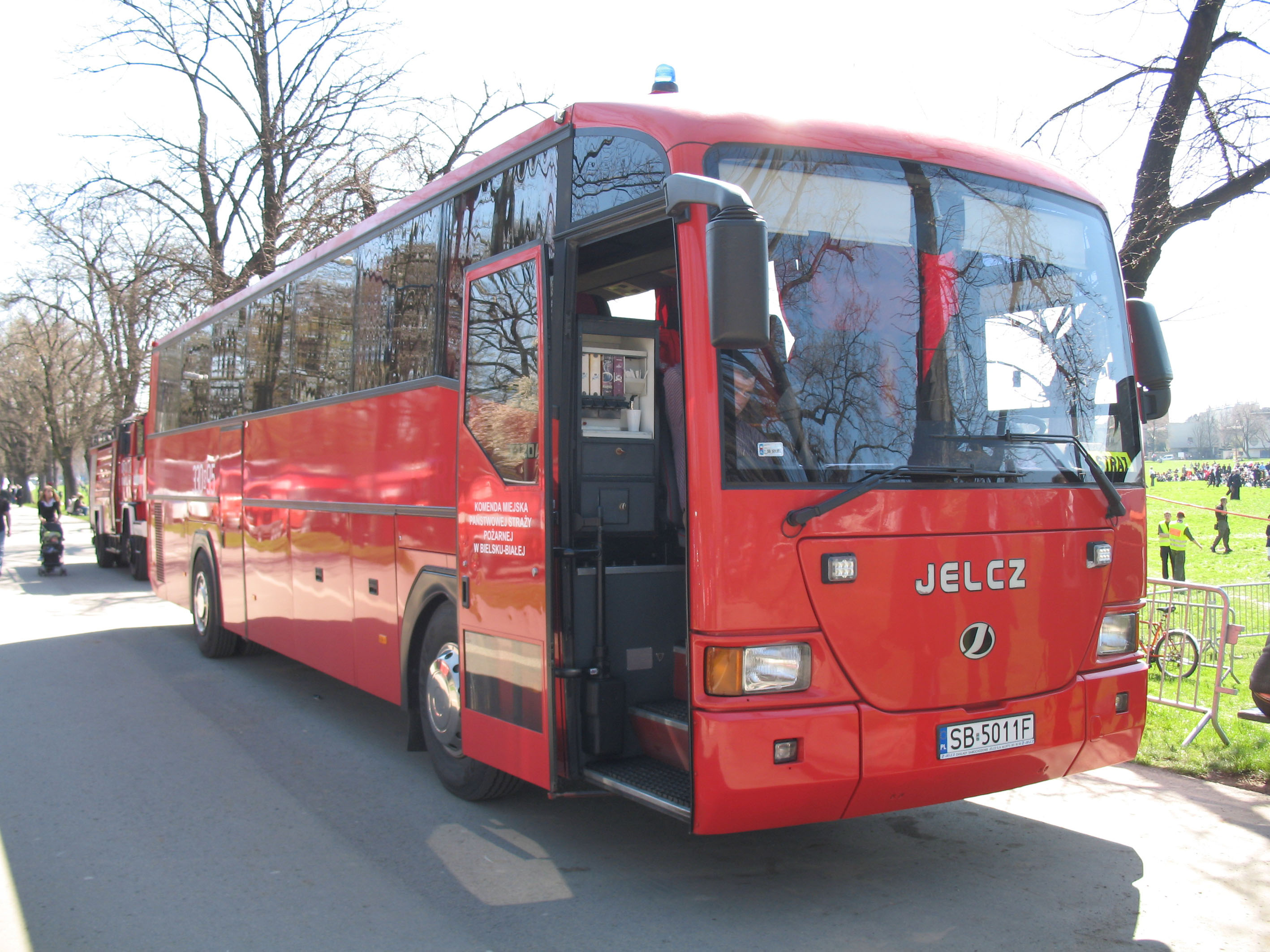
Jelcz T120-2
