= Sokół (motorcycle) =

Poland manufacturer of motorcycles

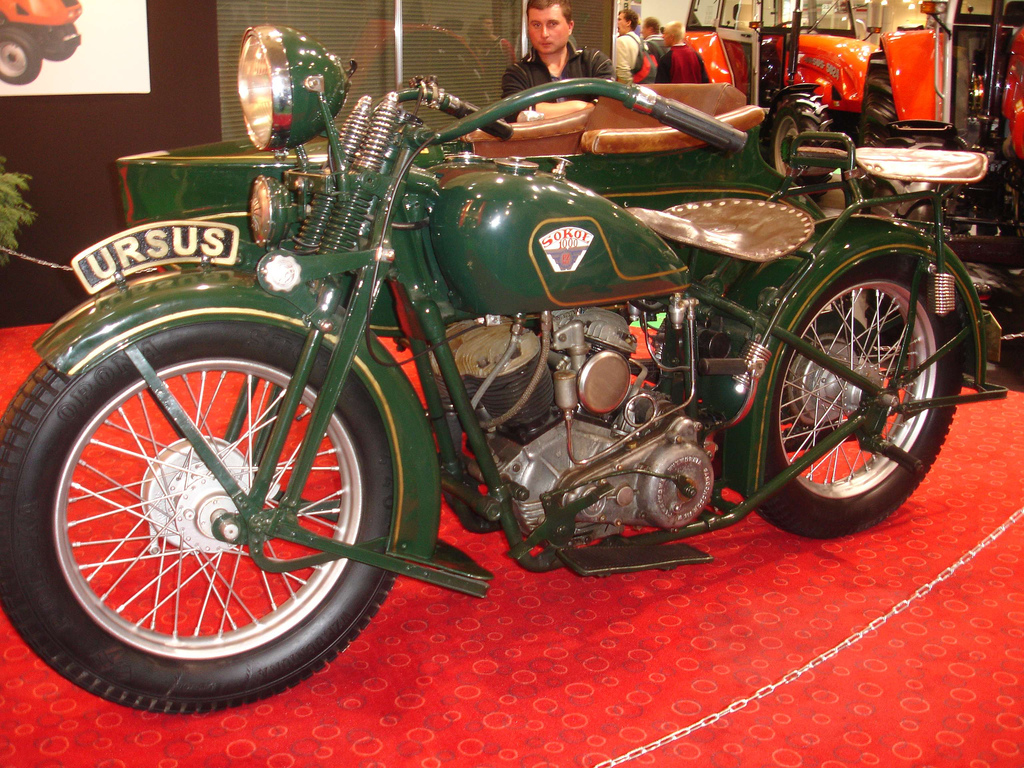
Sokół 1000

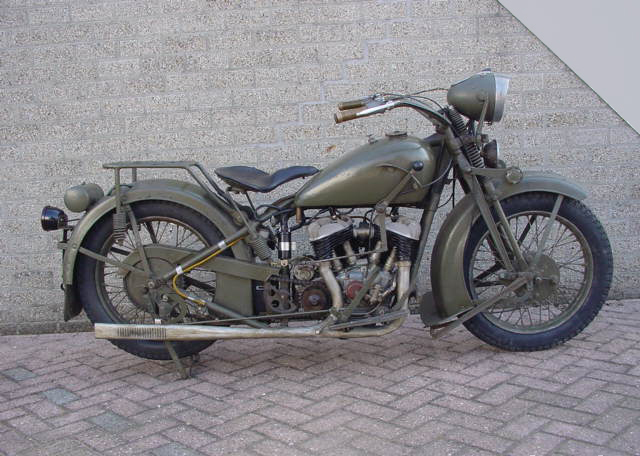
Military painting

Sokół (Polish: Falcon) was a brand of motorcycles manufactured in Poland before World War II for both civilian and military use. Initially designed and produced by the Centralne Warsztaty Samochodowe CWS company (Central Automotive Workshops), they were continued after its takeover by the PZInż between 1934 and 1939.

== History ==
The name was first used for the Sokół 600 RT tourist motorcycle, but is the most associated with the Polish Sokół 1000, a heavy motorcycle produced after 1936 for the Polish Army.

Chronologically, the Sokół motorcycles were as follows:

- Sokół 1000 M111 (CWS M111)
- Sokół 600 RT M211
- Sokół 500, a sport motorcycle
- Sokół 200 M411
- Sokół 125, built 1947–1950, a different design based on German DKW RT 125.

== Bibliography ==
- Zbigniew Otoczyński "Sokół 600 i 1000", WKŁ - Wydawnictwa Komunikacji i Łączności Sp. z o.o 1999, ISBN 83-206-1292-6
- Jan Tarczyński "Polskie motocykle 1918-1945" "The Polish motorcycle industry 1918-1945" Wydawnictwa Komunikacji i Łączności WKŁ 2005, ISBN 83-206-1579-8
- A.Jońca, R.Szubański, J.Tarczyński: "Wrzesień 39 - Pojazdy Wojska Polskiego", WKŁ, Warszawa 1990
- A.Jońca, J.Tarczyński, K.Barbarski: "Pojazdy w Wojsku Polskim - Polish Army Vehicles - 1918-1939", AJaKS, Pruszków 1995
