= Tadeusz Tański =

Polish automobile engineer

Tadeusz Tański (11 March 1892 – 23 March 1941) was a Polish automobile engineer and the designer of, among others, the first Polish serially-built automobile, the CWS T-1.

Tański was born in Moscow to Czesław Tański, one of pioneers of Polish aviation, and his wife Maria. Shortly thereafter they moved to Wygoda, close by to Janów Podlaski. Before the outbreak of World War I, Tański moved to Paris, where he studied engineering and specialized in airplane engines at the Ecole d’Electricite Industriel de Paris. During the war he designed and constructed a number of engines for various military planes, as well as studied extensively on armoured vehicles at the L. Bordon company. Later he also worked as an engineer for the Armstrong–Whitworth company. In 1916 he designed a 12 cylinder, 520 hp aircraft engine.

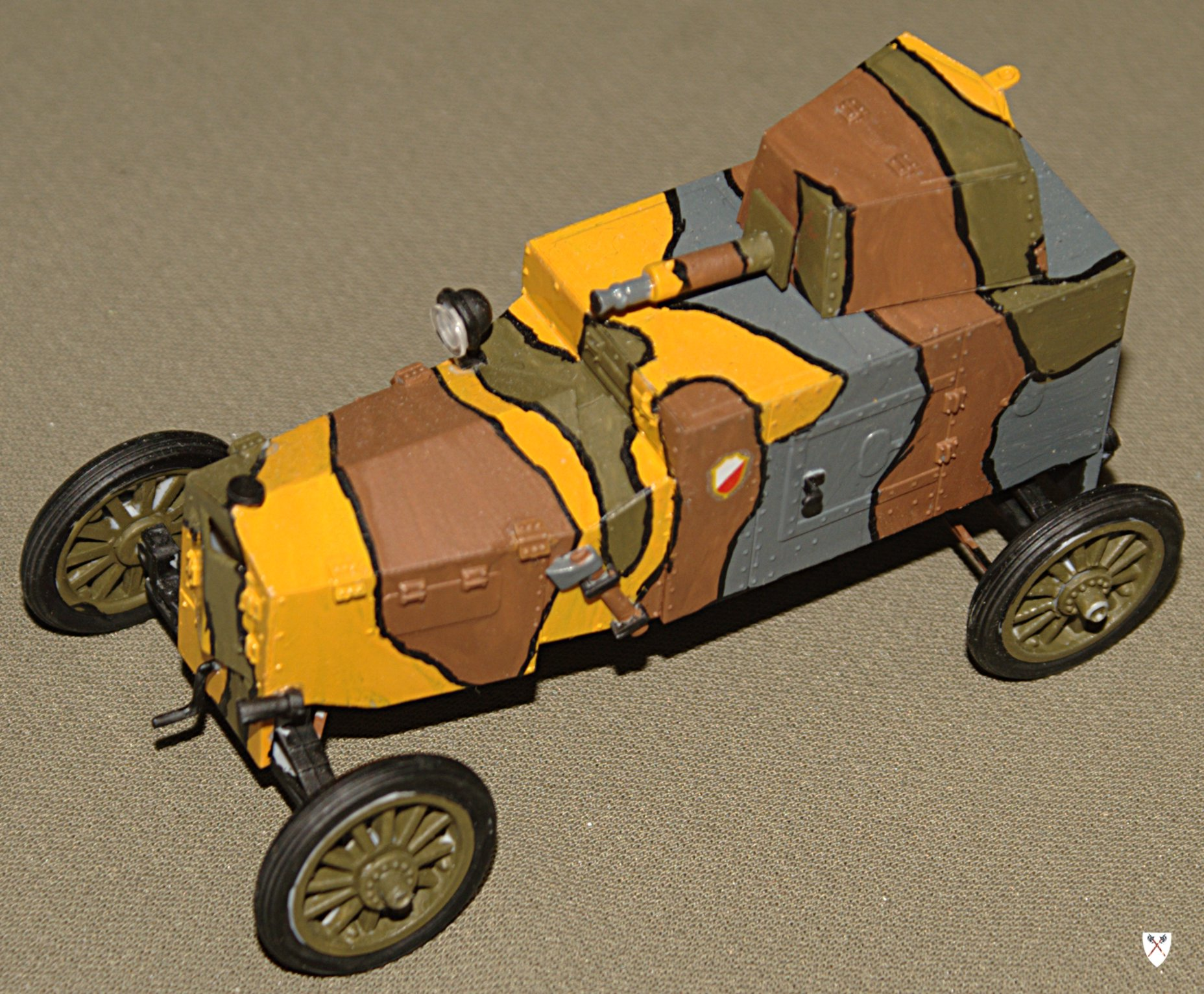
Ford FT-B

In 1919 he returned to Poland and started working for the Ministry of Military Affairs in the Automobile Section. During the Polish-Bolshevik War, in 1920 he constructed the first Polish armoured car, the Ford FT-B, based on chassis of the famous Ford T. Altogether 16 machines of this type were built, all of them used in front service.

After the war he remained one of the engineers working for the Polish arms industry, most notably the Centralne Warsztaty Samochodowe company. It was there in 1922 Tański designed, and later supervised the production of the CWS T-1, the first Polish serially-built car. Until late thirties he remained one of the most notable Polish constructors and the designer of numerous cars, lorries and artillery tractors.

After the Polish Defensive War of 1939 and the outbreak of World War II, Tański remained in German-occupied Poland. On 3 July 1940, at the height of the AB Action, he was arrested by the Germans and sent to Pawiak prison in Warsaw. At the end of January 1941 he was moved to the Auschwitz concentration camp, arriving on 1 February, and he was murdered there on 23 March 1941.

== Bibliography ==
- Lucyna Smolińska, Mieczysław Sroka "Wielcy znani i nieznani" Wydawnictwa Radia i Telewizji, Warsaw 1988.
