= Ford FT-B =

Polish armoured car

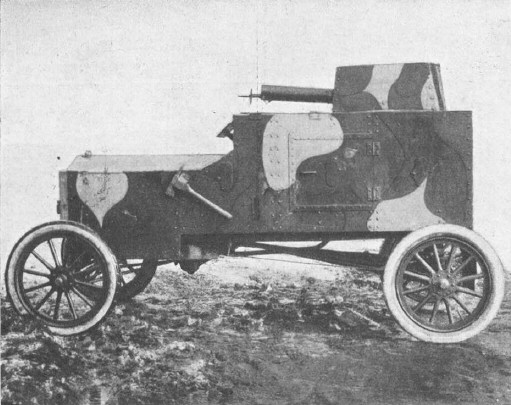
- Type: Armoured car
- Place of origin: Poland

Service history
- In service: 1920-1931
- Used by: Poland
- Wars: Polish-Bolshevik War

Production history
- Designer: Tadeusz Tański
- Designed: 1920
- Manufacturer: Gerlach i Pulst
- Produced: 1920
- No. built: 17

Specifications
- Mass: 1350 kg
- Length: 3.25 m (10 ft 8 in)
- Width: 1.55 m (5 ft 1 in)
- Height: 1.73 m (5 ft 8 in)
- Crew: 2
- Armor: 8 mm
- Main armament: 1 x 7.92 mm Maxim 08/15; 1,250 rounds
- Secondary armament: 25 x hand grenades
- Engine: 4-cylinder 2.9 L water-cooled gasoline engine 22.5 hp
- Power/weight: 16.6 hp/t
- Suspension: transversely mounted semi-elliptical spring for each of the axles
- Operational range: 250 km
- Maximum speed: 50 km/h (31 mph)

The Ford FT B (also known as Ford Tf-c and model 1920) was the first production armoured car designed and built in Poland. Built on the chassis of the Ford T and armoured with re-used armoured plates, the car was a successful design for its time. The main designer was the engineer Tadeusz Tański. The armoured vehicle originated on account of the high demand during the Polish-Soviet war in 1920.

== Development ==
After the outbreak of the Polish-Soviet War in 1919, the Polish Army was severely under-equipped. Except for a number of Renault FT tanks that arrived with the Blue Army formed in France, the Polish forces lacked any natively-built armoured reconnaissance vehicles. During the Soviet offensive leading to the battle of Warsaw the situation became even more tragic as many Austin-Putilov Armoured Cars that had been captured from the Red Army were retaken by the Bolshevik forces. It was then that Tadeusz Tański, a renowned inventor and a worker in the Ministry of Military Affairs, designed his armoured car. The project originated within only two weeks from Tanski’s initiative, and the prototype was prepared in less than two weeks at the Gerlach i Pulsing works in Warsaw. After a series of tests production started, and each of the combat ready cars was immediately dispatched to the front-line and attached to various units. Altogether a series of 16 or 17 cars were made.

The project was based on the successful Ford Model T, one of the most popular cars of the period. The chassis and the levers were significantly reinforced, and the fuel tank was moved. In addition, the crank was extended to allow for starting the engine from the inside and the dashboard was modified. The armoured plating was handmade out of scrapped German armoured trench shields and bolted to the chassis.

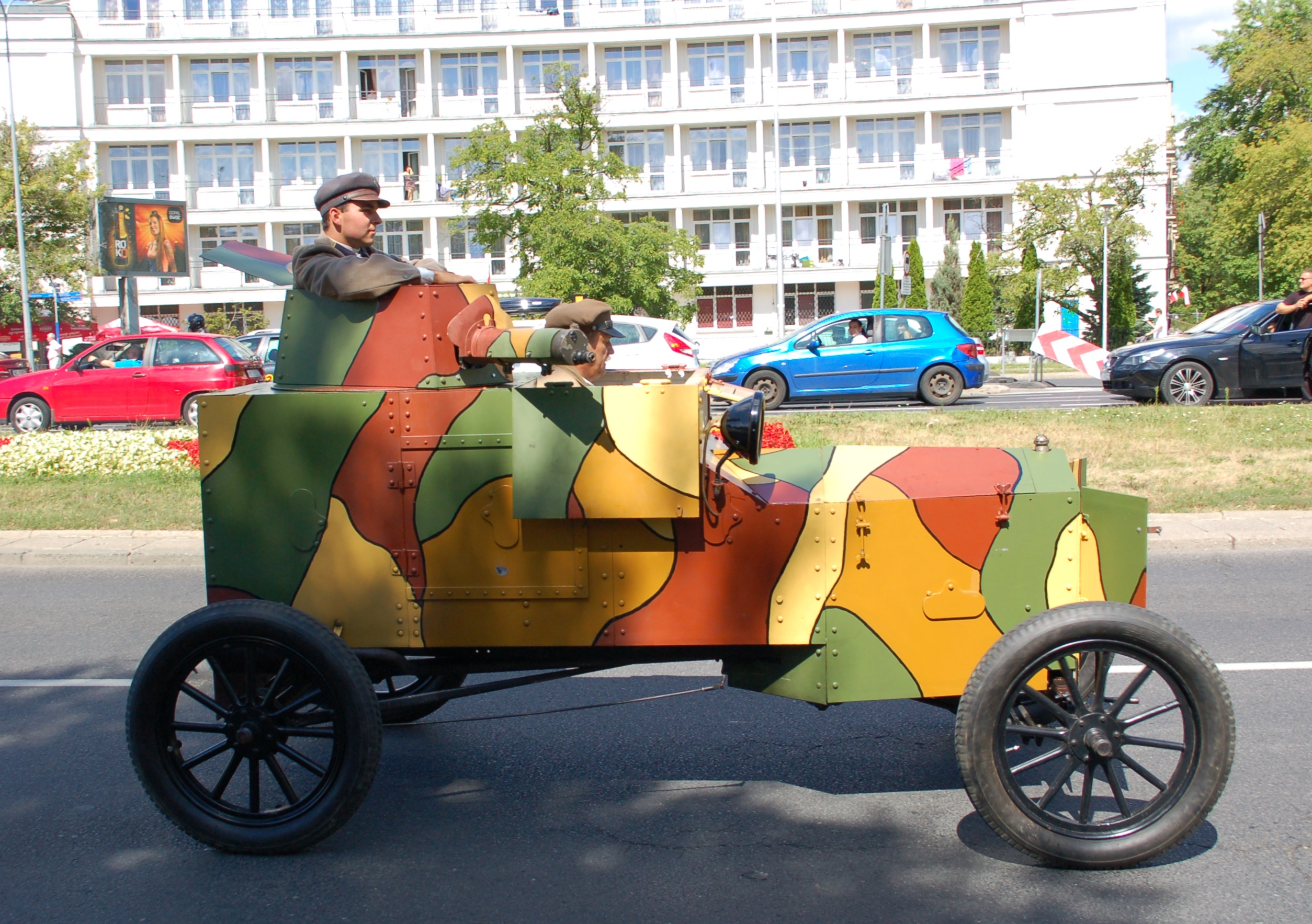
Modern replica

The FT-B cars took part in the later stage of the Polish-Soviet war and fought in the battles along the Wkra river and in the battle of Warsaw, the battle of Kowel and numerous other battles.

The high speed, agility, and uncomplicated servicing and repair (due to the commercial Ford T chassis) were among the advantages of the vehicle. In spite of the extra weight of the armour, the vehicles managed well in heavy terrain, and were also able to cross relatively weak bridges on account of their low mass in comparison to other armoured vehicles. The Ford Tf C was small in comparison to other armoured vehicles of the era, for example half the size of the Austin-Putilov, and offered a smaller target. Nevertheless, the consequence was that Ford Tf C were very cramped inside, and the driver had to steer from a squatting position. Another problem was engine overheating during longer cross-country drives, or with let down cooler armour plating. The springs were overloaded in spite of strengthening, but the vehicle was urgently required and the advantages offset the defects. In 1921 Tanski offered to build another series of 30 vehicles; however, this was rejected, because the war was over and no other armoured vehicles were required. Twelve Ford Tf C armored vehicles outlasted the war and were in use until 1931. Some had proper names such as "Osa" (wasp), "Mucha" (fly), and "Komar" (mosquito) painted on their armor.

== Bibliography ==
- Janusz Magnuski, "Samochody pancerne Wojska Polskiego 1918-1939", WiS; Warszawa 1993
- Tarczyński, Jan; Barbarski, K.; Jońca, A. (1995). "Pojazdy w Wojsku Polskim - Polish Army Vehicles - 1918-1939". Pruszków: Ajaks.
- Piotr Zarzycki, "Improwizowany samochód pancerny FT-B Model 1920"; Młody Technik 11/1988
- Magnuski, Janusz (1990). Samochód pancerny Ford. Warszawa: MMG.
