= Sokół 1000 =

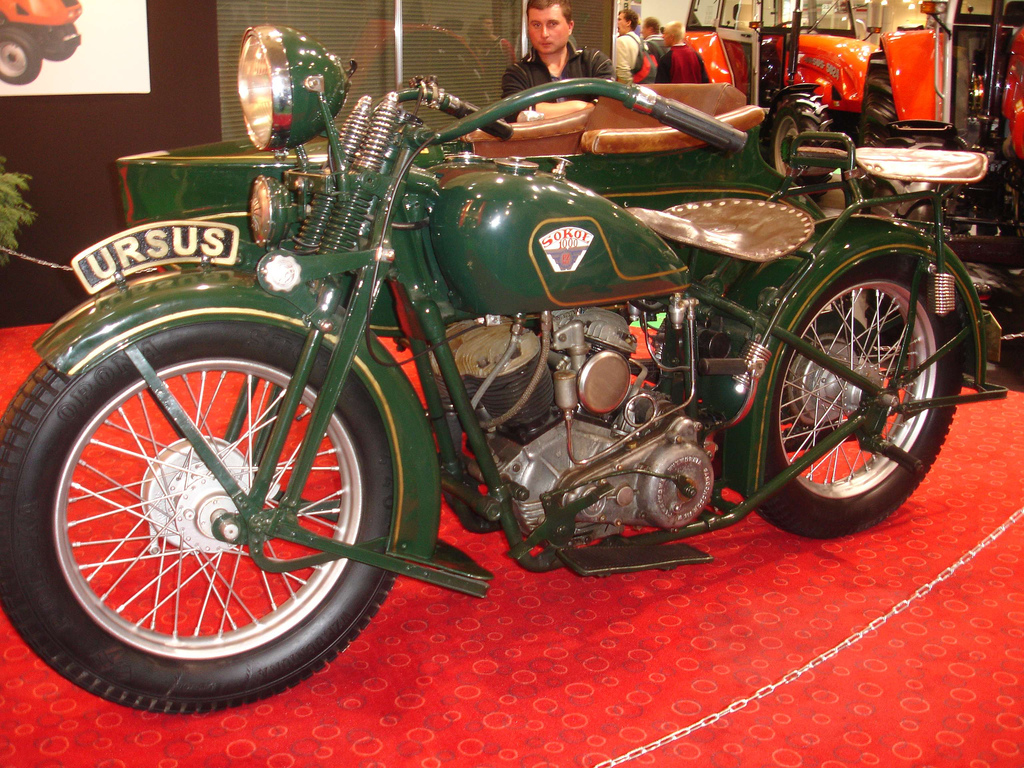
- Sokół 1000 model with the sidecar
- Manufacturer: CWS & PZInż
- Also called: CWS M111
- Production: 1933–1939 (ca. 3,400)
- Engine: 995.4 cc, four-stroke 45° v-twin
- Bore / stroke: 83 mm × 92 mm (3.3 in × 3.6 in)
- Compression ratio: 5:1
- Top speed: 100 km/h (62 mph)
- Power: 18 hp (13 kW) at 3000 rpm
- Suspension: 6-spring
- Wheelbase: 1,464 mm (57.6 in)
- Dimensions: L: 2,270 mm (89 in) (2,540 mm (100 in) with sidecar); W: 800 mm (31 in) (1,740 mm (69 in) with sidecar); H: 1,135 mm (44.7 in)
- Fuel capacity: 20 litres (4.4 imp gal; 5.3 US gal)
- Oil capacity: 3 litres (3.2 US qt)

The Sokół 1000 (also known as CWS M111) was the heaviest Polish pre-war motorcycle manufactured by the PZInż works, for both civilian and military use by the Polish Army. Production of the model 1000 started in 1933 and lasted until the outbreak of World War II in 1939. A standard completion was a sidecar combination.

== History ==
In late 1927 the Polish Army created a specification for a general purpose heavy motorcycle that was to replace the Harley-Davidson motorcycles used until then. By 1932 the Centralne Warsztaty Samochodowe works prepared a short series of roughly 200 CWS M55 motorcycles equipped with a sidecar. The bike itself was based upon the Harley-Davidson, while the engine was almost a direct copy of the Indian. However, the machine proved to be less reliable.

In 1931 it was decided at Państwowe Zakłady Inżynierii to prepare a completely new heavy motorcycle for the use of the Polish Army. Subsidized by the state, the PZInż holding extensively tested and modified the earlier M55 design to fit the specifications. Initially named CWS M III, the new construction was to be reliable, user-friendly, and immune to harsh conditions and bad service. As a result, the final motorcycle was slightly outdated, particularly heavy even as for its class, and expensive, with the civilian version selling for 4,200 złoty, or roughly US$800 or UK£170, a price only slightly lower than that of an average car of the epoch. Nevertheless, the model proved extremely reliable and durable.

Production of the 1000 started in 1933 and lasted until the outbreak of World War II in 1939. Mass-produced entirely in Poland (less than 5% of parts were imported), the Sokół 1000 maintained its high quality throughout the production period. Every tenth motorcycle delivered was extensively checked for parameters and all machines were road-trialed before delivery.

Its durability proved to be a major advantage and the Sokół 1000 was much faster off-road than many of the previously used American counterparts. Among the most notable innovations introduced in the Polish construction was a soft sidecar mounting, which allowed for easier handling and greater off-road speed.

The Sokół 1000 was also the basis for the Sokół M121 trike prototype, with the sidecar wheel powered. Its engine was also used for railway draisines.

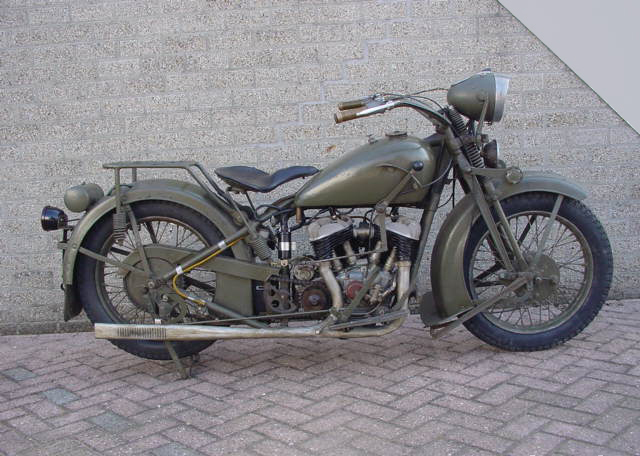
Military painting

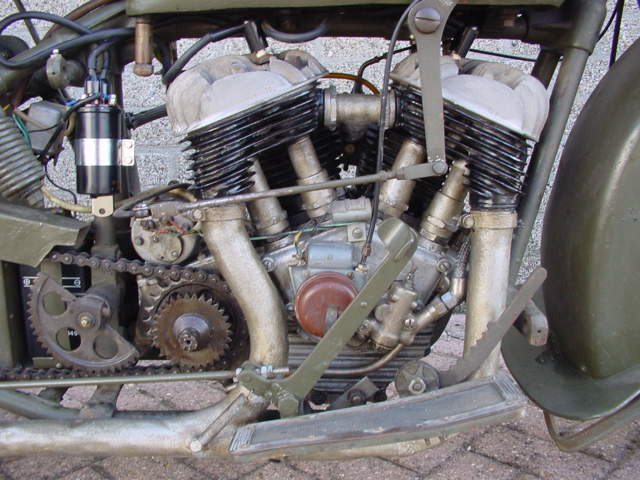
995 cc V-twin engine

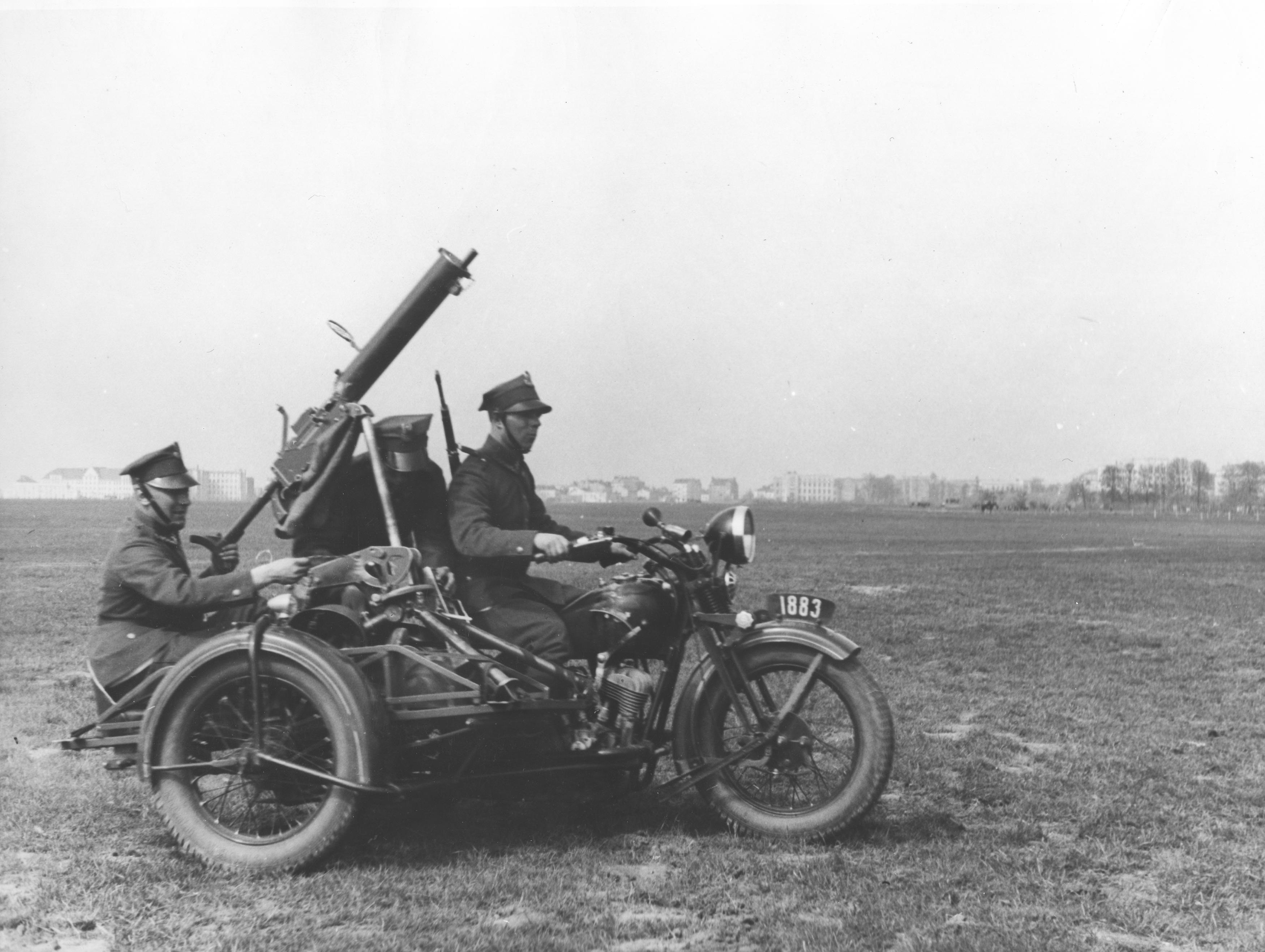
Ckm wz. 30 mounted on a Sokół 1000 with handle and sights adapted for anti-aircraft fire

== Bibliography ==
- Zbigniew Otoczyński "Sokół 600 i 1000", WKŁ - Wydawnictwa Komunikacji i Łączności Sp. z o.o 1999, ISBN 83-206-1292-6
- Jan Tarczyński "Polskie motocykle 1918-1945" "The Polish motorcycle industry 1918-1945" Wydawnictwa Komunikacji i Łączności WKŁ 2005, ISBN 83-206-1579-8
- A.Jońca, R.Szubański, J.Tarczyński: "Wrzesień 39 - Pojazdy Wojska Polskiego", WKŁ, Warszawa 1990
- A.Jońca, J.Tarczyński, K.Barbarski: "Pojazdy w Wojsku Polskim - Polish Army Vehicles - 1918-1939", AJaKS, Pruszków 1995
