= CWS T-1 =

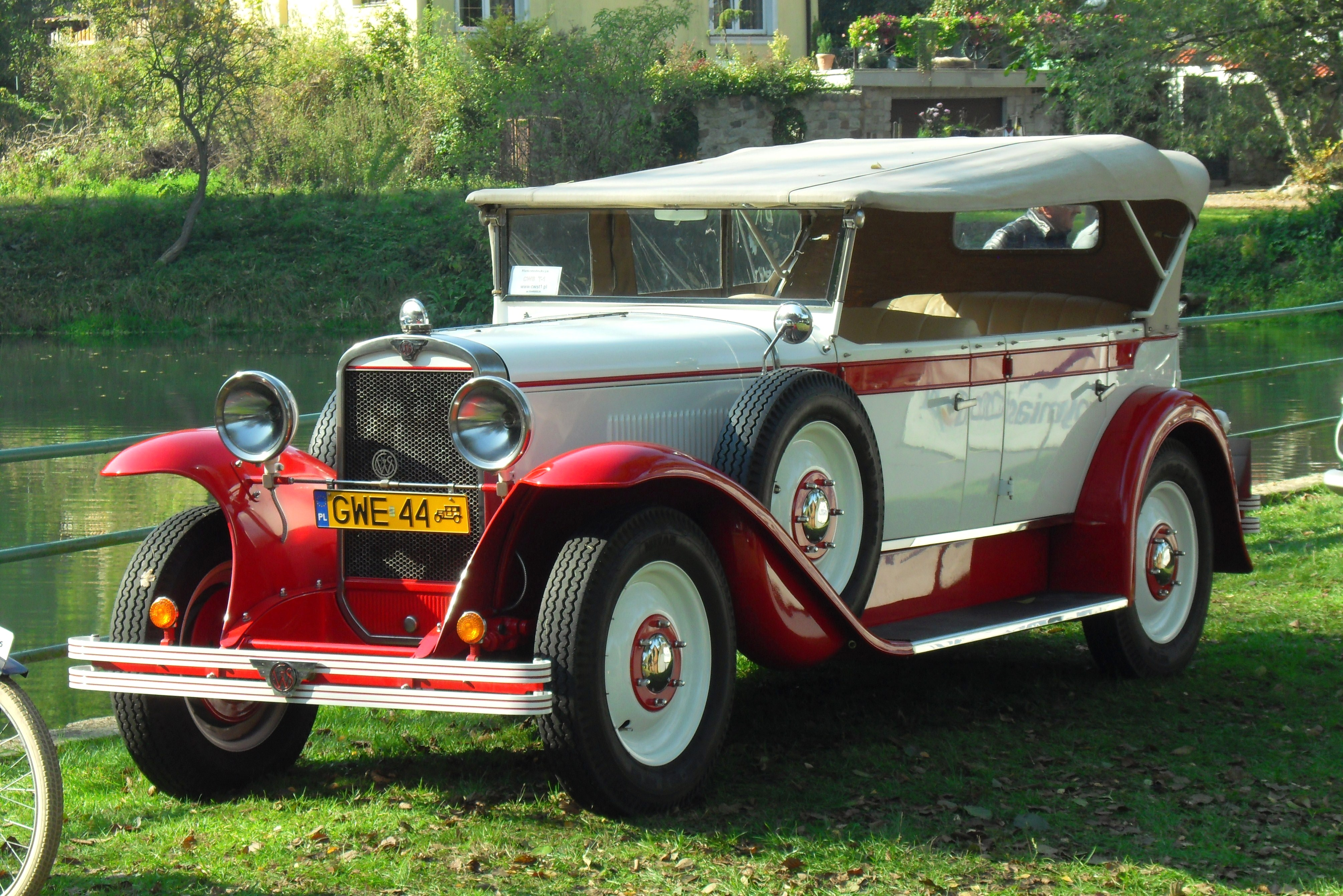
- CWS T-1 Torpedo replica.

Overview
- Manufacturer: Centralne Warsztaty Samochodowe (Central Automobile Workshop)
- Production: 1927/1928-1931/1932
- Designer: Tadeusz Tański & Stanisław Panczakiewicz

Body and chassis
- Body style: Saloon
- Layout: 4 door

Powertrain
- Engine: 182 cu. in.
- Transmission: 4 speed manual with reverse
- Propulsion: 4 cylinder petrol

Dimensions
- Length: 3.4 m
- Width: 1.4 m
- Curb weight: 1150 kg

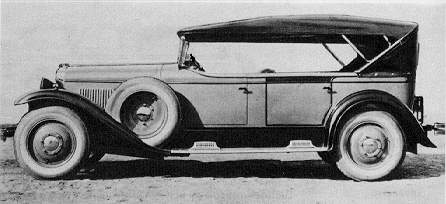
CWS T-1 Torpedo

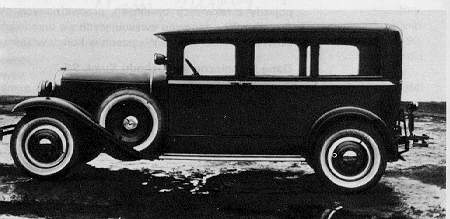
CWS T-1 Kareta

The CWS T-1 was the first serially-built car manufactured in Poland. A series of different cars based on the T-1 chassis designed by Tadeusz Tański (hence T-1) of the Centralne Warsztaty Samochodowe (hence CWS), with the body developed by Stanisław Panczakiewicz. It was the only motor car that could be completely dismantled and put together again with one tool, since all its screws and bolts had the same diameter (though one did need a screwdriver for the spark plugs).

== History ==
In 1927 serial production for CWS T-1 started.

Although the car was designed in 1922, it was not until 1925 the prototype tests were completed. Between 1925 and 1932 approximately 800 CWS T-1 and T-1 variants were produced.

Among them were:

- Torpedo (open-top)
- Kareta (Hardtop)
- Berlina (Sedan)
- Cabriolet (in fact a semi-convertible)
- Pick-up
- Van

In 1930, the CWS works were absorbed by the Polish state-controlled industrial giant PZInż, yet the production was continued under the previous name. However, in 1932, a license for the Polski Fiat was purchased from Italy as the Fiat was cheaper to produce and the parent company of CWS did not have mass-production capabilities.
