= Centralne Warsztaty Samochodowe =

Defunct automobile manufacturer based in Warsaw, Poland

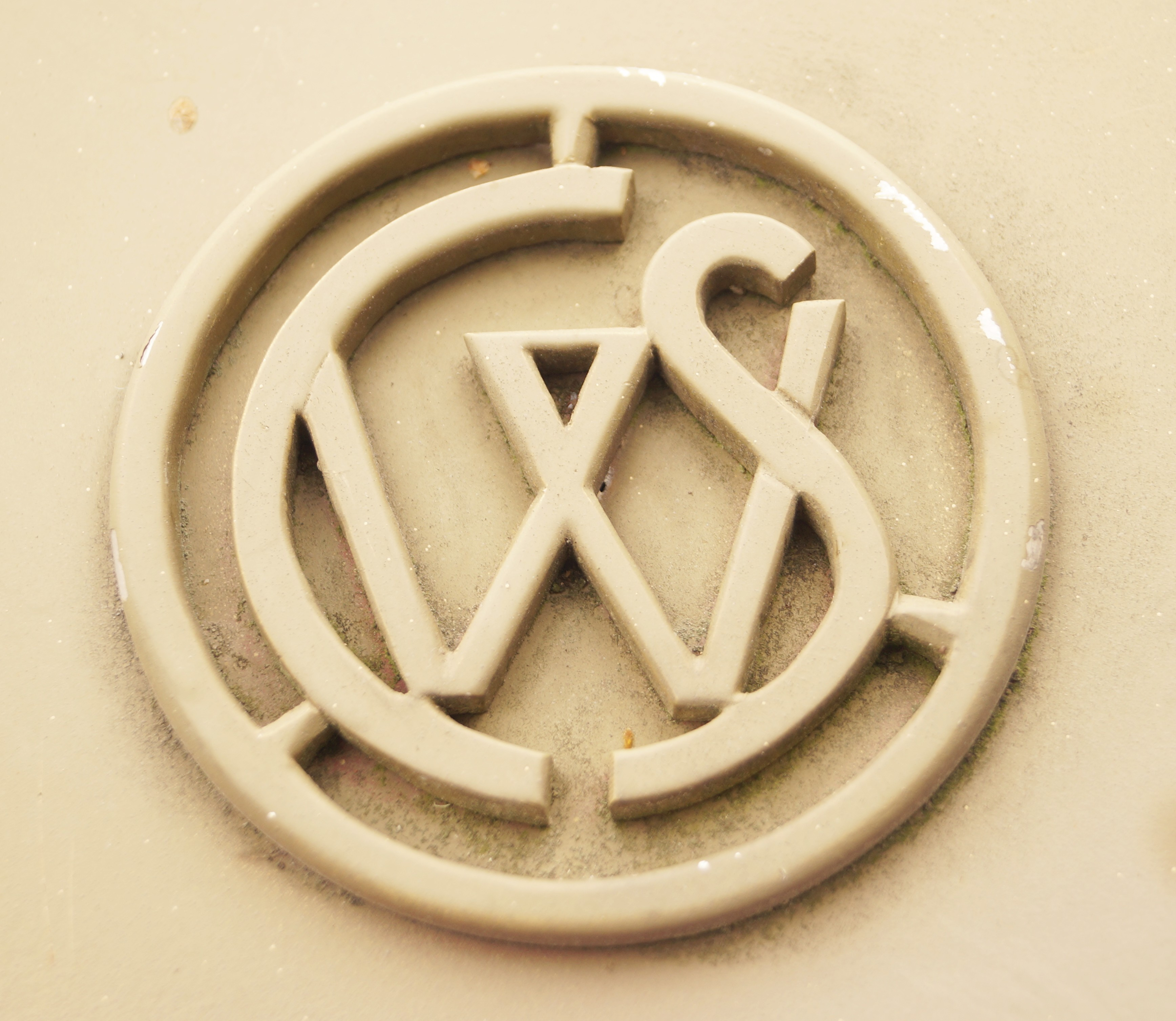
- Industry: Automotive
- Founded: 1918
- Defunct: 1928
- Headquarters: Warsaw, Poland
- Area served: Poland
- Products: Automobiles
- Number of employees: over 1000 (1926)

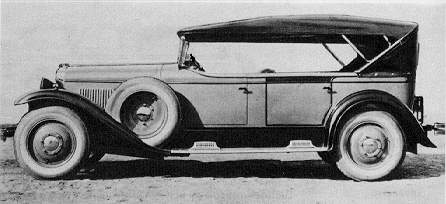
CWS T-1 Torpedo

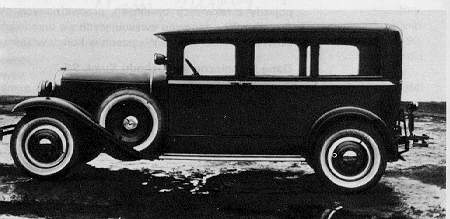
CWS T-1 Kareta

Centralne Warsztaty Samochodowe (CWS; transtlation from Polish: Central Car Works) was a Polish pre-war car and motorcycle manufacturer. Created by the Polish Ministry of War Affairs in 1918, the privately run company was initially entitled to service of all the mechanical equipment of the Polish Army, including tanks, armoured cars, motorcycles and lorries.

With time, the CWS also started to produce its own designs of cars and motorcycles. Among the most notable designs were the CWS T-1 (the first Polish-made car to be serially built), T-2 and T-8 limousines, as well as the extremely successful Sokół motorcycle series. In 1928 the company was partially nationalized and renamed to Państwowe Zakłady Inżynieryjne (State Engineering Works, PZInż), but it continued to use the old name of CWS as the brand name for the motorcycles until the outbreak of the Invasion of Poland.
